Iloilo City, officially the City of Iloilo, is a 1st class highly urbanized city in the Western Visayas region of the Philippines on the island of Panay. It is the capital city of the province of Iloilo, where it is geographically situated and grouped under the Philippine Statistics Authority, but remains politically independent in terms of government and administration. In addition, it is the center of the Iloilo–Guimaras Metropolitan Area, as well as the regional center and primate city of the Western Visayas region. According to the 2020 census, Iloilo City has a population of 457,626 people. For the metropolitan area, the total population is 1,007,945 people.

Iloilo City is a conglomeration of former towns, which are now the geographical or administrative districts consisting of: Villa de Arevalo, Iloilo City Proper, Jaro (an independent city before), La Paz, Mandurriao, and Molo. The district of Lapuz, a former part of La Paz, was declared a separate district in 2008. 
 
Iloilo was the second Spanish colonial center after Cebu in the Philippine Islands. It was founded in 1566 when the Spanish established a colony area between the towns of Ogtong (present-day Oton) and La Villa Rica de Arevalo (present-day city district). It was one of the royal Spanish cities in the Philippines in the Spanish East Indies. The honorific royal title, "La Muy Leal y Noble Ciudad" which translates to The Most Loyal and Noble City, was given by the Queen Regent of Spain, Maria Christina, for the city's loyalty to the Spanish crown during the Philippine Revolution, the second city to have such a byname in the country after the City of Manila. At the turn of the 20th century, Iloilo was second next to Manila in terms of economic importance in the country. Before the Treaty of Paris ceded the Philippines to the United States in 1898, Iloilo served as the Spanish Empire's last capital in Asia and the Pacific. Iloilo was also the capital of the Federal State of the Visayas, a short-lived state in the central Philippines patterned after the United States federalism and the Swiss confederacy. In modern times, the city remains one of the Philippines' most influential cities in terms of its history, culture, and economy.

The city is the regional hub of education, culinary, religion, healthcare, tourism, culture, industry and economy in Western Visayas. A thriving academic center, Iloilo City is a melting pot which draws foreign and local students from various parts of the country and abroad. Central Philippine University (CPU), a university founded by American Protestants through a grant of John D. Rockefeller as the first Baptist and second American institution of higher learning in Asia, attracts 15,000 enrollees from different parts of the Philippines and twenty-seven foreign countries annually, the largest for a single campus university in the Western Visayan region.

The city's excellent urban planning and the continuing increase in real estate, financing, and business process outsourcing (BPO) demand have been attributed to its being one of the most livable cities in the country with an economic boom. In March 2022, Colliers Philippines named Iloilo among the top locations for the expansion of outsourcing activity outside Metro Manila. According to CBRE Group, by 2025, it is projected to become the third largest hub for the IT-BPO industry in the country.

Etymology
The name "Iloilo" is derived from the older name "Ilong-ilong" (Philippine Spanish: Ilong̃-ílong̃) meaning "nose-like", referring to the promontory between two rivers (Iloilo and Batiano) where the Fort San Pedro and the 17th-century Spanish port were located.

History

Pre-colonial period 

Nothing is known historically about the region prior to the arrival of the Spanish. In Historia natural del sitio, fertilidad y calidad de las Islas e Indios de Bisayas (1668), the Jesuit missionary Francisco Ignacio Alcina (1668) identifies the origin of the Hiligaynon people of "Oton" (Panay) as the island of Leyte, which correlates with the linguistic subgrouping of the Hiligaynon language.

Numerous legends and fabrications, however, exist on the origins of the Hiligaynon people. Among them is the epic Maragtas by Pedro Monteclaro (first published in 1907), which describes how ten datu and their families, led by Datu Puti, left the "kingdom of Borneo" to escape the cruel reign of Sultan Makatunaw. They arrived in the island of Panay and negotiated a sale of the lowlands with King Marikudo of the Ati people. The price is said to be a golden salakot for Marikudo and a long golden necklace for his queen, Maniwan-tiwan. A pact of friendship was then forged between the two peoples, and the Atis performed their native songs and dances, which is then said to be the origin of the Ati-Atihan Festival. According to Augustinian Friar Rev. Fr. Santaren recording in the Spanish era of this Pre-Spanish legendary history, that Datu Macatunao or Rajah Makatunao who was the "sultan of the Moros," and a relative of Datu Puti who seized the properties and riches of the ten datus was eventually killed by the warriors named Labaodungon and Paybare, after learning of this injustice from their father-in-law Paiburong (Datu of Iloilo), sailed to Odtojan in Borneo where Makatunaw ruled. The warriors sacked the city, killed Makatunaw and his family, retrieved the stolen properties of the 10 datus, enslaved the remaining population of Odtojan, and sailed back to Panay. Labaw Donggon and his wife, Ojaytanayon, later settled in a place called Moroboro. The Maragtas also goes on to describe other settlements by "Malay datu" in other areas in the Visayas and Luzon.

While once widely accepted and included in school textbooks, Maragtas (as well as the Code of Kalantiaw) is now regarded by modern scholars to be an early 20th century hoax. The historicity of the epic was first challenged by the historian William Henry Scott in 1968. Scott successfully defended his criticism before a panel of experts in Filipino history (including Gregorio Zaide, Teodoro Agoncillo, etc.), some of whom had once promoted the inclusion of Maragtas in books on Philippine history.

A more recent 2019 thesis, "Mga Maragtas ng Panay: Comparative Analysis of Documents about the Bornean Settlement Tradition" (Talaguit, 2019) has uncovered a slightly earlier account of the Bornean migration myth by the Augustinian Friar, Rev. Fr. Tomas Santaren. His account, Bisayan Accounts of Early Bornean Settlements, was first published in 1902 as an appendix to the book Igorrotes: estudio geográfico y etnográfico sobre algunos distritos del norte de Luzon by Fr. Angel Perez. Santaren's account is allegedly a direct Spanish translation from two manuscripts acquired from locals in Iloilo sometime after 1858 when he was stationed there. The details on Santaren's account corroborate most of Monteclaro's. However, the manuscripts that Santaren translated from were presumably only written during the colonial era in romanized Hiligaynon, since pre-colonial Visayans transmitted history via oral tradition, not in writing. Thus it is still unlikely that they are of pre-colonial origin. It is, however, accurate to regard the Maragtas (or at least elements of it) as being derived from local folk history, rather than authentic history or simply fabrications by Monteclaro.

There was a mention of Iloilo's current town of Oton in Yuan Dynasty records in the 1300s when Oton was called in Hokkien .

In Panay, according to Friar Gaspar de San Agustín, O.S.A., "...in the ancient times, there was a trading center and a court of the most illustrious nobility in the whole island."

Early Spanish colonial period 

In 1519, King Charles I of Spain already acquired and inherited Catholic kingdoms. He is the King of all Spain, King of Germany and Holy Roman Emperor, Duke of Burgundy and Luxembourg, Count of Holland, Count of Barcelona, Count of Flanders, Prince of Asturias, Archduke of Austria, King of Aragon, King of Jerusalem,  Catalonia, Valencia, Naples, two Sicilies, Corsica and Sardinia. King of the Western and Eastern Indies, of the Islands and Mainland of the Ocean Sea. King of Italy, King of Bohemia and Hungary. He commissioned Ferdinand Magellan to circumnavigate the globe especially to establish International Trade in Spice Island. The dangerous and uncertain voyage as 5 ships with 270 men departs from Seville and by 1520, the expedition have traversed for months calm Ocean they called Pacifico or Peaceful. The mountains of Samar and Leyte was visible as they drew closed which the crew called " Las Velas " or the Sails. They disembark in unpopulated Homonhon Island for a week from a long journey for food and water and call the place "Buenas Senas" or good sign. They navigated through the Strait of Siargapo and at landed Limasawa Island and were received peacefully by locals. Delighted, the Spaniards planted a cross on a hill and the first mass was celebrated. It was the first Spanish settlement and the birthplace of Christianity in the Philippines. The locals were introduced to visit another kinsman chieftain along the Butuan River. The King of Butuan received the Spaniards on April 8, 1521. Returning to Limasawa, The Prince of Limasawa also told them about 3 powerful Kedatuan – in Sugbu, Yrong-yrong and Tondo.  On March 17, 1521,  Magellan named the newly discovered Island as " Las islas de San Lázaro". By April 7, Magellan arrived in Sugbu. Datu Zula of Mactan sent Magellan 2 goats.

Humabon tricked Magellan to kill Lapu Lapu, the Datu or chieftain of nearby Mactan Island. The men of Humabon who accompanied Magellan did not engage in battle with Lapu-Lapu. Magellan was hit by a poisoned arrow he turned toward his men who were returning to the ships and fell down. The next day, Rajah Humabon of Sugbu offered a Banquet for Spaniards. Twenty-seven Spanish sailors died due to poisoning by Cebuanos. Rajah Humabon restored friendly relations with Lapu-Lapu, as he is married to Hara Humamay, Lapu-lapu niece.

Under Philip II, in 1565, the Spaniards in Mexico returned to Cebu to avenge Magellan's death against the treachery of Cebuanos. Miguel López de Legazpi pillaged and burned houses in Cebu for days. Cebuanos retreated, fearing the heavily armored Spaniards now with formidable reformed-infantry called Tercios composed of alabardero, alférez with a sword and Arcabucero with gunpowder. Miguel López de Legazpi directed Felipe de Salcedo along with Spanish Friar Martín de Rada and other Augustinian missionaries to look for food. They disembarked in Iloilo and established a temporary settlement in Araut somewhere in Dumangas. In 1566, they founded a settlement in the areas between Ogtong (Oton) and the present-day La Villa Rica de Arevalo district of Iloilo City. Though founded in 1566, Oton, which forms a big part of the area in the said settlement with Arevalo, was established formally in 1572 as the second official Spanish colonial outpost after Cebu City. The city was founded by 80 pure Spaniards from Europe and reinforced by 169 Mexican soldiers from Latin America.

Unlike the Indianized Cebuanos who were neutral to the Spaniards or the partially Islamized Tagalogs of Manila who were more hostile, the people of Madja-as welcomed the Iberians as allies since at that time period, Madja-as was locked in a war against the invading Muslims, especially with the Sultanate of Brunei and its vassal states, the Sultanate of Sulu and the Kingdom of Maynila which, according to Spanish Governor-General Francisco de Sande, are their blood-cousins. The people then fervently accepted Christianity as they supplied the bulk of the mercenaries used in the conquest of partially Islamized Manila, whose rulers were related to the Sultan of Brunei.

When the Spaniards came to the Visayas, they noted that the pirates among them were more terrifying than the Mohammedans of Jolo and Mindanao. All year long, after the harvest, they would sail toward faraway places to hunt slaves and make surprise attacks on settlements. Those who did not live along the rivers, would make their raids in the months of February, March, April, October and November, going deeper into the interior parts of the islands, sacking the villages. These raiding expeditions are called panggubat (noun) or manggubat (gerund verb form).

However, upon Christianization and Hispanization, the fiercest slave-raiders among the Philippine islands, the people Panay and the other Christianized peoples of the archipelago were converted and reformed and they abandoned the practice of slaving, piracy and raiding and contented themselves to be simple soldiers or farmers.

In 1581, Ronquillo moved the colonial center from Ogtong to approximately  eastward due to recurrent raids by Moro pirates and Dutch and English privateers. He renamed this new colonial seat La Villa Rica de Arévalo in honor of his hometown in Ávila, Spain. Ronquillo also settled groups of Spanish and Mexican soldiers to become the first colonists of Arevalo as he built his mansion in the area. The Chinese traders supplying the colonists then established themselves in Iloilo's parian Molo. Meanwhile, Jaro was soon filled up with various kinds of mestizos (Mixed raced people) and Mandurriao hosted the growing Indian community near the Nanak Darbar Indian Sikh Temple.

In the early days of the Spanish period; the first Manila Galleons were originally constructed at the port of Oton to the west of Iloilo. Since there was no precedent in Spain for the immensity of a Manila-Galleon, it could be argued that the proto-type Manila galleons were of Visayan design since the Visayans were already constructing huge multi-masted 4 to 5 decked caracoas in their wars against the other kingdoms and thus, the technical know-how to construct the first Manila galleons was an amelioration of Visayan shipbuilding with Spanish shipbuilding. Oton built the first Manila galleons before operations were eventually transferred to the Bicol and Cavite shipyards.

1600s–1700s 

In the year 1600, a large Muslim attack on Iloilo City was launched, with a force of 70 ships and 4,000 warriors, raiding and attacking several Visayan islands in order to abduct slaves. However, the attack was repulsed by a force of 1,000 Visayan warriors and 70 Mexican arquebusiers under the command of the Don Juan Garcia de Sierra (the Spanish alcalde mayor), who died in battle. With the increase in Moro incursions toward the end of the sixteenth century, Spanish defenses in the Visayas were strengthened by the construction of a fort at Iloilo staffed by two companies of (Mexican) soldiers.

In 1635, in an effort to check the Islamic slave-raiding into the Visayas islands, the Christian Visayans from Iloilo together with Spanish officers and their Latino soldiers from Peru soon founded Zamboanga City and settled in it, using it as a fortress to prevent Moro attacks in the Visayas, and as a staging ground for Christian campaigns into Muslim Mindanao.

In 1700, due to ever-increasing attacks especially from the Dutch and the Moros, the Spaniards again moved their seat of power some  eastward to the village of Irong-Irong, which had natural and strategic defense against raids.  At the mouth of the river that snakes through Panay, the Spaniards built the Fortificación de Nuestra Señora del Rosario en el Puerto de Yloylo, Provincia de Oton (now called Fort San Pedro) to better guard against the raids which were now the only threat to their hold on the islands. Irong-Irong or Ilong-Ilong was shortened to Iloilo. Later, the natural port area quickly became the capital of the province.

Sugar boom era and the late Spanish colonial period (1800s) 

Spanish colonial local government in Iloilo allowed Chinese migrants which worked among the city's industries (the Locsin, Lopez, Jalandoni, Lim and Sy families) and Latin Americans from across the Pacific (Viceroyalty of New Spain) to man its military fortifications (the Araneta, De Rama and Arroyo families). In the late 18th century, the development of large-scale weaving industry started the movement of Iloilo's surge in trade and economy in the Visayas.

Sometimes referred to as the "Textile Capital of the Philippines", the products were exported to Manila and other foreign places. Sinamay, piña, and jusi are examples of the products produced by the looms of Iloilo. Because of the rise of the textile industry, there was also a rise of the upper middle class. However, with the introduction of cheap textile from the UK and the emergence of the sugar economy, the industry waned in the mid-19th century.

The waning textile industry was replaced, however, by the opening of Iloilo's port to the world market in 1855. Because of this, Iloilo's industry and agriculture was put on direct access to foreign markets. But what triggered the economic boom of Iloilo in the 19th century was the development of the sugar industry in Iloilo and its neighboring island of Negros. Sugar during the 19th century was of high demand. Nicholas Loney, the British vice-consul in Iloilo, developed the industry by giving loans, constructing warehouses in the port, and introducing new technologies in sugar farming. The rich families of Iloilo developed large areas of Negros, which were later called haciendas, because of sugar's high demand in the world market. Because of the increase in commercial activity, infrastructures, recreational facilities, educational institutions, banks, foreign consulates, commercial firms and much more sprouted in Iloilo.

City Status

On October 5, 1889, a royal decree raised Iloilo's status from a town to a city, this on account of growing development in commerce and industry making her second to Manila in importance. Iloilo thus succeeded Manila, Cebu and Vigan as officially declared cities. Through the Becerra Law of 1889, the ayuntamiento of Iloilo was established on January 7, 1890, its inauguration led by the former Governor-General Valeriano Weyler. Iloilo City was the second-most important city in the archipelago at the end of the Spanish Regime.

The Revolutionary Period (1896) 

The immediate reaction of Ilonggo elite to the outbreak of the 1896 rebellion in Manila was that of surprise. They immediately responded with protestations of outrage and affirmed their loyalty to Spain. The Ilonggos themselves were united in their support of Spain during the first two years of the revolutionary period.

Shortly after the Cry of Balintawak, the Jaro Ayuntamiento (another colonial city adjacent to Iloilo City), composed of native Ilonggos, convened a special session on September 1, 1896, where the Manila uprising was condemned as an unpatriotic act "that finds no echo in the noble hearts of Jareños, who do not forget the immense gratitude they owe Spain who, from nothing, raised us to a life of civilization and progress."

The Ayuntamiento of Iloilo also affirmed its allegiance and loyalty to Spain and made a similar protestation. Condemning the uprising, the city's letter to the Governor General says:

"Those dark betrayals, the mere notion of which embarrasses good and loyal Filipinos, have produced a unanimous sentiment of protest and indignation among the Ilongo people, who engrave its most honorable blazon in the sacred and inextinguishable love that it professes to the glorious Spanish nationality that it legitimately feels proud of. The Ilongos are Spaniards, Your Excellency, and Spaniards will they be until death, because they do not want to live and die in another way than under the shadow of the august Castillan standard, to which they owe being dignified and free men now."

The foreign community in the city also asked its representatives to visit local authorities and to elevate their protests against the revolt. And so did the Filipino parish priests of Jaro, Molo, Mandurriao, and Arévalo. Towns in Iloilo province also condemned the Manila uprising, and those of the neighboring provinces of Cápiz and Antique, as well as the island of Negros, followed suit. This emboldened the Ilonggo elite to initiate the organization of volunteers to be sent to quell what was seen as a mostly-Tagalog rebellion. The move was backed by the Spanish and foreign communities of Iloilo. A battalion of five hundred native volunteers was raised, which was divided into two companies, and placed under the cadre of mostly Spanish officers. They arrived in Manila on January 16, 1897. They were one of the largest native contingent to serve the government forces against Katipunan troops led by Emilio Aguinaldo, in the battlegrounds of Cavite province.

The Ilonggo volunteers established for themselves a distinguished combat record in Cavite. Once the Pact of Biak-na-Bato was signed, they returned to Iloilo. In April 1898 their homecoming, just like their departure, was met with much fanfare. This galvanized the Ilonggos into more public outpourings and manifestations of loyalty to Spain.

Due to the loyalty of the Ilonggos, the city of Iloilo was honored with the perpetual title of Muy Noble (Most Noble). The Royal Decree granting this title was signed on March 1, 1898, by Queen Regent Maria Cristina. Over time, this title earned for Iloilo City the reputation of it being the Queen's Favored City in the South or simply Queen's City in the South, being the second Spanish port of importance next to Manila, and being located south of the archipelago's Capital. On a side note, at the beginning of the American period until the Second World War, Cebu became the second port of importance (Iloilo having been partly ravaged by bombardment, fire, and riots during the American occupation of Iloilo City).

Yet, it was also during this period of Philippine history that Iloilo was more popularly known as the Queen City of the South. This points to the fact that the moniker was associated with the Queen Regent's favor and with the honorary title granted to Iloilo City as La Muy Leal y Noble Ciudad (The Most Loyal and Noble City), due to the loyalty of its citizens to the Spanish Crown. Besides, the Ilonggos, who were among the first allies of the Spanish Crown in the archipelago, contributed in the Spanish conquest of Luzon. It was in Arevalo (later, a district of Iloilo City), Panay that the conquest of Luzon was planned and launched, on May 8, 1570, with the help of seafaring inhabitants of the Island.

After the defeat of the Spanish forces at the Battle of Manila Bay during the Spanish–American War, the Capital of the Spanish East Indies was transferred to Iloilo, with General Diego de los Rios as the new Governor General residing in the city. A truce was declared between the American and the Spanish forces pending the negotiations of the joint commission of both warring Countries in Paris, France for the terms of peace. Meanwhile, General Aguinaldo sent several small vessels to Panay with Tagalog revolutionaries in order to stir up rebellion in the Visayas. He was anxious to secure all territories he could before the conditions for peace should be settled in Paris. At stake was the hope that actual possession of territories would influence the final decision.

By October 1898, fresh Tagalog expeditions were sent to Panay and coerced or persuaded its people to rise in greater force than ever, until finally, General de los Rios had to fall back to Iloilo. By the middle of November, after having secured the support of the inhabitants of the towns outside Iloilo through the leadership of General Martín Delgado, practically the whole island of Panay, except for Iloilo (the City Proper), Jaro, La Paz, and Molo, was under the revolutionary dominion. By December, de los Rios held only the city and port of Iloilo.

On December 25, 1898 (fifteen days after the signing of the Treaty of Paris on December 10), the Spanish government surrendered to the Ilonggo revolutionaries at Plaza Alfonso XII (Plaza Libertad today), making Iloilo the last capital of the Spanish Empire in Asia and the Pacific. Military Provincial Governor Ricardo Monet, who was representing Governor General de los Rios, together with Lt. Col. Agustín Solís, formally handed over Plaza Alfonso XII to Delgado, who represented Emilio Aguinaldo, president of the newly established Philippine Republic, in Iloilo. Delgado was named provincial governor afterwards.

The newly found freedom of the Ilonggos would be short-lived. The American forces arrived in Iloilo on December 27, 1898, under the command of General Marcus P. Miller, and were afterwards reinforced up to a total strength of about 3,000 troops and two ships, to take possession of the territory in accordance with the Treaty of Paris.

The Federal State of the Visayas was established on December 2, 1898, to promote the ideal of federation for an independent Philippine nation. It was composed of the Cantonal governments of Bohol and Negros, as well as the Provisional Government in the Visayas, which exercised powers over Panay and Romblon. The government of the federal state was patterned after the United States federalism and the Swiss confederacy. The government was reportedly created following consultations with Emilio Aguinaldo. Roque Lopez, who was the president of the provisional government in Panay, became the federal state's president and Iloilo City was designated as the Visayas capital.

Filipino–American War

After the Spanish forces left the city, the revolutionary forces made a formal entry amidst music and banners. A government was constituted. On January 17, 1899, an election placed Raymundo Melliza, of a notable family from Molo that was respected by both the natives and foreigners, to office as Mayor. However, the influence of the new regime established by the government of Aguinaldo did not have effective extent far beyond a day's march from the Capital. At the threshold of the City and Province of Iloilo, the Americans were waiting for a signal from Manila. Two more ships supplemented the U.S. forces, even though no clashes with the revolutionaries took place after the Spaniards abandoned the city. Miller expressed demands for the surrender of Iloilo but no gun was fired. The Americans were waiting for the right moment, for it was not until February 6, 1899, that the American Senate ratified the Treaty of Paris.

On February 4, hostilities broke out between Aguinaldo's forces and the Americans in Luzon. Emissaries brought Aguinaldo's message to the Ilonggos to hold the City against the enemies. The demand for surrender was renewed by Miller, on February 7, upon receipt of orders from Manila, with the threat to bombard Iloilo by the 12th day of the month if no surrender would take place.

As the Americans were preparing to attack the city, the 1,650 native troops under General Martin Delgado became uncontrollable and insolent to their officers. They were promised a monthly remuneration of Php4 and food, but only received Php1. Threats of mutiny, sacking and burning of the city, forced the Generals to collect money from the towns of Panay in order to appease the Visayan contingents. The same thing happened to the Tagalog component of the troops. The danger of riots in the city and the attitude of native soldiers fomented fear among the inhabitants. Chinese merchants closed their stores leaving only a small hole for transacting business. Many prominent families, who were in constant fear for their safety, went over to Negros Island in small schooners that flew the Philippine flag, without having any trouble with the American ships on standby in the waters between the two islands.

On February 10, an Extraordinary Session at the City Hall discussed plans for the impending bombardment of the city. There was a proposal to burn Iloilo, but the Mayor protested to this barbarous plan. A majority in the meeting was in favor of burning, which was seen as an invitation to despoil, lay waste and slay. The instigators who had no property interests in Iloilo, but who were so jealous of those who have, found a ready response of the Tagalog mercenaries, who had no local attachment to the city.

The Americans fired the first shell on February 11, 1899. Foreign eyewitnesses observed that the bombardment damaged quite a few buildings. In the meantime, from early morning, the withdrawing native soldiers, followed by a riffraff mob, were observed to have rushed hither and thither, throwing firebrands on to petroleum-washed houses. The Chinese had to barricade themselves to no use since fire burned their bazaars. Europeans and the Spanish half-castes had to defend themselves with every means possible, including bribing the rioters with a few pesos. Two British warships in the roadstead sent boats ashore and landed a party of marines, who made a gallant effort to save foreign properties, as the United Kingdom had a strong business interest in Iloilo and a Consulate.

By 1 o'clock of the same day, the Americans made a landing and restored order. Sentinels were stationed to protect what still remained of the townspeople's goods. In due course, indemnity claims were forwarded to the American military authorities, but were all rejected.

Ten years later, an article published in the local paper Nuevo Heraldo summarized the downfall of the Queen City in these words:

"The fire left behind only the name Iloilo, as the main part of the city was reduced to ashes by the retreating Ilongo troops. That event was the cause of the ruin of such a beautiful city, second only to Manila, where, if there was not a surplus of money, neither the people's welfare was wanting, and life was prosperous and peaceful. If the brain who planted such an unqualified act had measured the consequences... maybe he would never have dared doing it..."

By February 1899, the Americans had started mobilizing to colonize anew the City and Province. They continued to meet resistance from the Ilonggos, which lasted up to 1901. In which case, Iloilo was also among the last cities to fall to Americans. Many leaders surrendered to the new regime and were reintegrated to the Ilonggo society without conditions. Among them was General Martin Delgado, who accepted the position of Governor of the Province of Iloilo from 1901 to 1904, under the American flag. He was, at that time, the highest-paid Governor in the whole Archipelago, receiving $3,000 gold annually.

Local government was established in some towns of Iloilo by April 11, 1901. Jose Maria Gay was appointed Alcalde, Matias Hibiernas was teniente alcalde of Iloilo;Jose Yusay was President of Molo; Pablo Borromeo was President of Arevalo; Ruperto Montinola was the lone representative of Jaro, but was not its president; Madurriao's president was Emigdio Mesa. Emilio Magbanua was appointed its police delegate. It was observed by Juan de Leon, judge of the Court of First Instance that there existed a rivalry between the pueblos of Iloilo, Jaro and Molo, which are adjacent to and are only half an hour travel by carriage from each other. Besides, Molo and Jaro are residential pueblos, and Iloilo was the business town for both. It was also recommended that Arevalo be joined to Molo, and La Paz to Jaro. The aggregate population of these territories was at 100,000 in 1901. Presidents and other representatives were also appointed for the towns of Alimodian, Miag-ao, Janiuay, Mina, Oton, Passi, Guimbal, Pototan, San Joaquin, Santa Barbara, San Miguel, Pavia, Sara, Nagaba (currently known as Nueva Valencia), San Enrique, Lambunao, Cordoba (a barangay of Tigbauan today), Cabatuan, Leganes, Tigbauan, Banate, Buena Vista, Navalas, Tubungan, Duenas, Mandurriao, Maasin, Lucena, and Leon. Other formerly existing ones, like Anilao and Barotac Viejo, were fused with other towns.

As the aftermath of the revolution and the Filipino–American War, it was clear to all the most sober-minded and best-educated Ilonggos that Aguinaldo's government was a failure in Panay at least. Visayans of position, with property interests at stake, were convinced that absolute independence without any control or protection from some established political power was premature and doomed to disaster. The Visayan grudge against the Tagalog predominance was also a factor that contributed to the failure of Aguinaldo's government. But the aggravating factor was the dictatorial air and brutal conduct of the Tagalog troops, which destroyed the theory of fraternal unity. Ananias Diocno, the Tagalog contingents' leader known for severity in his Capiz and Iloilo campaigns, left a lasting non-commendable remembrance in the history of Panay.

American colonial era and advent of Protestantism and counter-reformation (1900–1941) 

In 1900, no Americans reverted the city's status into a township. By virtue of Act No. 719 of 1903, the municipalities of Jaro, La Paz, Mandurriao, and Molo, were incorporated into the municipality of Iloilo. Pavia was also incorporated into Iloilo from Santa Barbara by virtue of Act No. 1333 19 April 1905. Later, Executive Order No. 64 24 December 1907 separated Pavia and Jaro from Iloilo and constituted them as the municipality of Jaro with effect on February 15, 1908. La Paz was re-established as a separate municipality in 1920 by virtue of Executive Order No. 70 signed on October 11, 1919.

The Americans initiated the construction of the Baluarte and Arroyo streets, the extension of Delgado Street to Valeria and from Fuentes and Jalandoni streets up to the present-day U.P. in the Visayas. Quezon and Mabini streets were asphalted while their sidewalks were also constructed. More significant was the installation of streetlights all throughout the city in 1921. In 1926, the widening of important streets, like General Luna, J.M. Basa and Ledesma, was started. In 1927, an improved street, Valeria-Ledesma (formerly known as Weyler), was inaugurated (David 1937).

During the American colonial regime that time in the Philippine islands, the Americans brought with them their Protestant faith. A comity agreement was made in 1898 that the Philippine islands would be divided into different Protestant denominations for missionary works to avoid future conflicts; Iloilo is one of the first favored places in the country where the early Protestant sects came because of the city's economic prominence and importance next to Manila during such time. Western Visayas and Negros, in accordance with the comity agreement, was given to the religious jurisdictions of the Baptists, although other Protestant sects were allowed to do missions in the same area.

The Protestant missionaries initiated large-scale enterprises in the predominantly Catholic province. The Presbyterians established the first Protestant and American hospital in the country, the Iloilo Mission Hospital. Supposedly it came also that Iloilo is the original location for foundation of Silliman University, the first Protestant and American university in the country and in Asia. However, due to the Catholic opposition where the school will stand, the founder, David Hibbard, prospected some new locations. He went to Cebu and later had a side trip in Dumaguete, where he had a decision to establish and where Silliman University is presently located.

Baptists on the other hand, established institutions like Central Philippine University in 1905, as the first Baptist-founded and second American university in Asia; the Jaro Evangelical Church, the first Baptist church in the Philippines; and the Convention of Philippine Baptist Churches, the oldest Baptist organizational body in the Philippines. Later, the Seventh-day Adventists established the Jaro Adventist Center, the first organized Seventh-day Adventist church outside Manila.

Central Philippine University was established through a grant given by the then richest American industrialist and oil magnate John D. Rockefeller. Central Philippine University pioneered the work-study program in the country which was later patterned and followed by other institutions and has also established the first and oldest student governing body in South East Asia modeled on the American civil government, the Central Philippine University Republic in 1906 after the Jaro Industrial School, CPU's forerunner, was established.

Under the auspices of the Presbyterian Church in the United States in 1901, the Sabine Haines Memorial Union Mission Hospital (Union Mission Hospital) was established by American missionary doctor Joseph Andrew Hall and his wife Jane Russell Hall. The hospital is also the first hospital for soldiers and the constabulary (predecessor of the Philippine National Police) during the American colonial regime in the country. The hospital pioneered the nursing education in the country through the establishment of the Union Mission Hospital Training School for Nurses, the first nursing school in the Philippines. Later, the hospital was handed over to the Protestant Baptists. In 1931, the Union Mission Hospital moved to its present site in a property bought by the Baptists, thus a year later in 1932, the hospital changed its name to Iloilo Mission Hospital along with its nursing school. The school was later transferred and became and organic academic unit of the Central Philippine University (the present-day Central Philippine University College of Nursing. Iloilo Mission Hospital has over the years associated with Central Philippine University as its university hospital (CPU-Iloilo Mission Hospital).

Up to the present, the various evangelical Protestant denominations (composing around 2.8% of the Filipinos) and their educational institutions also serve Catholic students in Iloilo, who make up 83% of the population.

Seizure of friar lands and parishes and the above-mentioned Protestant activities gave the American and Filipino public an impression of an anti-Catholic stance of the U.S. occupation of the Islands during the first years of the American rule. The Taft Commission,  the sole legislative body of the American government for the Philippines (then known as the Philippine Islands under the sovereign control of the United States) while still under the Philippine–American War, were attacked by Catholic press in New York for anti-Catholic bigotry. Soon, pressures from influential Catholics in the United States, and also in Ireland caused President Theodore Roosevelt to appoint a Catholic in the commission to defend Catholic interest in the Philippines. Influential Catholics in Manila followed suit. Worries about Catholic vote in national elections moved the civil government to send the commission to the Vatican to negotiate exploring workable to solutions to the Catholic question in the newly acquired territory. Before coming to Rome, the head of the Commission personally visited the Cardinal Archbishop of Baltimore. Pace by pace, acceptable solutions were employed. In 1902, the President of the United States of America commissioned two American Augustian friars to pioneer a movement to send American priests out to the Philippines to replace the Spanish friars, who diminished in number (1,013 in 1898 to 246 in 1903) due to normal loss of personnel due to death or retirement, death caused by native hostilities, or voluntary return to Spain.

In Iloilo, American Catholics countered the Protestant American missions and the American Catholic bishops, like Frederick Rooker, Dennis Joseph Dougherty, and James McCloskey, were named for the Roman Catholic See of Jaro in Iloilo City. These bishops sustained the educational achievements of the Spanish friars by bringing in American and European Catholic missionaries, among whom were the Sisters of Charity of St. Paul, and Augustinian missionary priests. The Augustinians, who were the first to bring the Christian faith in the Philippines as well as in Panay island, and who built the centuries-old heritage churches in this island, established the Collegio de San Agustín in 1904, which eventually became the only university of the Augustinian Order in Asia. During the American regime, their confreres from the United States developed evermore this institution, which later became the first university in Iloilo. The American Catholic Bishops also maintained and upgraded the St. Vincent Ferrer Seminary (established in 1869 as the Collegio-Seminario de San Vicente Ferrer), which was the first institution of higher learning in Western Visayas. Despite the Augustinians being Catholics and Baptists being Protestants, they mutually enriched each other through dialogue mainly because Augustinian ideals were the foundations of Protestantism since the first Protestant was Martin Luther and he was a former Augustinian priest himself and the Protestant zeal for reformation from corruption even started some reform in the church itself. Saint Ezekiel Moreno who was ordained in the Minor Orders in Jaro, Iloilo had walked the fine line between reform, obedience and leadership since he ministered and walked hand in hand with condemned rebels and criminals in the Iwahig Prison and Penal Farm, he was also obedient to his superiors in the Order of Augustinian Recollects, a reform or "Recollection" movement in the Augustinian Order, which took elements from the Protestant Reformation. Saint Ezekiel Moreno also became the leader of a political movement when he became a Bishop of Pasto, Colombia.

The visitation of Saint Ezekiel Moreno is a harmonized incarnation of the ancient Convivència in Spain when different religions and kingdoms; Pagan, Christian, Jewish and Muslim lived side by side and struggled to maintain their perspective purity, contested with each other and yet also mutually enriched each other without turning into a mongrelized melting pot of a mixed up and confused morass. Coincidentally, Saint Ezekiel Moreno was ordained in the Minor Orders in the then church of Jaro which housed a Virgin Mary statue under the Title of "Nuestra Señora de la Candelaria de Jaro". An image with complex Convivència alluding properties due to the confluence of many symbols from various cultures simultaneously present in the image but it is likely not earthly of nature and is a pure grace direct from heaven or an image "Not carved by human hands" due to its miraculous nature which was found floating in a river, shifting in weight and growing in size.

The Paulinian Sisters took charge of St. Paul Hospital, originally owned by the Catholic Diocese of Jaro. Bishop Dennis Joseph Dougherty, who later became Cardinal Archbishop of Philadelphia, gave the medical facilities to the Sisters. To commemorate the bishop's generosity, the hospital named a more recent section of the facilities after him: the CADMA (Cardinal Dougherty Medical Annex). To meet the growing need to provide nurses for their hospital, the Paulinians also opened a nursing school. Today, this institution has also become a university (St. Paul University Iloilo), and has ever since supplied high-quality healthcare professionals known worldwide for their skills and dedication to work.

During the American colonial occupation, one of the platforms by the colonial government was first to establish and implement a public education system in the islands and the Thomasites were deployed and commissioned by the American government to teach in the public schools that will be established. The Thomasites tolerated religious freedom, which is one of the foundations of the United States constitution and legacy to the Philippines, while commissioned and under their tutelage to teach in public schools during the colonial period. Public schools that were established when the Thomasites came to Iloilo are Iloilo Normal School, the present-day West Visayas State University (formally established in 1924 but dates back its founding in 1902 as part of the Philippine Normal School System in the Philippines); the Iloilo National High School, the first public provincial high school in the islands; and Baluarte Elementary School, the first public elementary school in the islands.

Commonwealth Act No. 57 was passed in 1936 granting city status to Iloilo; this charter was immediately amended by Commonwealth Act No. 158 some days later to incorporate the municipalities of La Paz and Arevalo as part of the new city's territory. Iloilo regained cityhood status on July 16, 1937, through Commonwealth Act 158. Incorporated as part of Iloilo City were the towns of La Paz and Arévalo and inaugurated on August 25, 1937. The municipality of Jaro, on the other hand, was incorporated into Iloilo City some years later by virtue of Commonwealth Act No. 604 22 August 1940, which amended the city charter of Iloilo to include, into Iloilo City, the municipality of Jaro  "on the date that the President of the Philippines may set by proclamation". To that effect, President Manuel L. Quezon issued Proclamation No. 663 on January 7, 1941, giving January 16 as the date of Jaro's incorporation into Iloilo City. Sugar's demand was declining, labor unrests in the port area scared the investors away, and the opening of the sub-port of Pulupandan in Negros Occidental moved the sugar importation closer to the sugar farms.

Japanese occupation (1942–1945)

By 1942, the Japanese invaded Panay and the economy moved into a standstill. During World War II, Iloilo was controlled by several Japanese battalions. Japan's ultimate goal was to entrench itself deeply into the Philippines so that at the close of the war they could occupy it just as the Spanish and the Americans had years before.

When Iloilo was liberated by Filipino and American forces from Japanese military occupation on March 25, 1945, the remnants of these battalions were held in Jaro Plaza as a makeshift detention facility.

Post-war decline 

The war heavily damaged the infrastructure in Iloilo. However, the continuing conflict between the labor unions in the port area, declining sugar economy, and the deteriorating peace and order situation in the countryside, the exodus of Ilonggos to other cities, provinces/regions and islands that offered better opportunities and business. People were moving to other cities such as Bacolod, Cebu, and Manila that led to Iloilo's decline in economic importance in central Philippines. Rural agricultural areas continued to help the local economy. For years, because of this exodus of investors, Iloilo's economy progressed in a moderate pace.

Change slowly came. First came the construction of the fishing port and a new international seaport. One by one, commercial business firms invested in Iloilo, spurring on the city to its eventual recovery.

Iloilo became a highly urbanized city on December 22, 1979, by the virtue of Batas Pambansa Blg. 51. Corollary to this new status, its residents effectively lost their eligibility to vote for provincial officials.

21st century and economic boom 
After the opening of the new commercial and business center in Mandurriao district and with the construction of a national highway that traverses this area, big businesses like the SM Supermalls, SM Prime Holdings, Megaworld Corporation, Gaisano Capital, Robinsons Land, Ayala Corporation, and Filinvest poured in huge investments in the city, giving impetus and catalyst toward future progress.

Geography 

Iloilo City is located in the southern shores of Panay Island. The city faces Iloilo Strait and Guimaras Island across it, making it a natural harbor and a safe anchorage for ships. It is bordered by the towns of Oton in the west, Pavia in the north and Leganes in the northeast. Just across the Iloilo Strait in its eastern and southern coastlines, are the towns of Buenavista and Jordan in the island-province of Guimaras
.

The city lies on a flat alluvial plain, reclaimed mostly from the swampy areas due to urbanization and industrialization in the late 19th century until the present. Traversing the city are the rivers of Iloilo, Batiano, Jaro and Dungon Creek. Iloilo River is an estuary that separates the districts of City Proper, Molo and Villa Arevalo from the rest of the city. On the other hand, Jaro River is fed by its tributary rivers, Aganan and Tigum. Lately, a new escape channel for floodwaters coming from these two rivers to Iloilo Straight was developed, the Jaro Floodway.

The city is divided into seven geographical districts.  All of the districts were once individual towns, excluding Lapuz, which was a sub-district of La Paz until 2008. All districts have their own town centers complete with a plaza, a Roman Catholic church, a fire station, a police station and a public market. City Proper is a commercial area and the political center of the city and the Province of Iloilo and the Regional Government Center of Western Visayas.

Iloilo City is the center of the only officially recognized Metropolitan Area in Western Visayas. The metropolitan area is composed of the City of Iloilo, the municipalities of Leganes, Pavia, Santa Barbara, Cabatuan, San Miguel, Oton, the Island Province of Guimaras and its five municipalities, namely – Sibunag, San Lorenzo, Nueva Valencia, Buenavista and Jordan.

Barangays and districts 

The city of Iloilo has one legislative district and is further divided into seven administrative districts, which are also subdivided into barangays (barrios), with a total of 180 city barangays.

Climate
Iloilo City has a tropical wet and dry climate as according to the Köppen climate classification system, with pronounced wet season from June throughout November; then dry season from December to May.

Demographics

Language 

Hiligaynon is the dominant language of Iloilo City. English is used as the language of business and education. In addition, other local languages such as Karay-a (also known as Kinaray-a or obsolete Haraya) is also spoken by the minority. Spanish, once widely spoken during the colonial era up to the 1980s, is dying out, though a broken Spanish creole is spoken by a few of some Spanish-blood families and elderly sugar barons.

Hiligaynon is spoken in Panay, Guimaras and Negros islands, and is part of the Visayan language family of the Malayo-Polynesian languages. Because Iloilo was a former Spanish colony for 300 years, Hiligaynon is heavily influenced by the Spanish language with a plethora of loaned words (Guerra, Puerta, Golpe, Aguanta, Puerto, Calle, and Edificio, among others). Hiligaynon is mainly concentrated in the provinces of Iloilo, Guimaras and Negros Occidental. The language is referred to as "Ilonggo" in Iloilo and Negros Occidental. More precisely, "Ilonggo" is the ethno-linguistic group referring to the inhabitants of Iloilo and the culture associated with native Hiligaynon speakers. The distinction between the terms, Ilonggo and Hiligaynon, is unclear however, as many townspeople state that Hiligaynon is the language being spoken and Ilonggo is a term used to refer a person living in Iloilo or its associated culture and ethnicity.

Population 

Based on the 2010 Census of Population and Housing (CPH), Iloilo City, a highly urbanized city in the province of Iloilo, posted a total population of 424,619 persons as of May 1, 2010. This is larger by 58,228 persons compared to its total population of 366,391 persons counted in the 2000 CPH. The increase in the population count from 2000 to 2010 translated to an average annual population growth rate (PGR) of 1.49 percent. This is lower than the 1.70 percent annual PGR of the city between the census years 1990 and 2000.
 
If the average annual PGR recorded at 1.49 percent during the period 2000 to 2010 continues, the population of Iloilo City would double in 47 years.

Forty years ago, the population of Iloilo City was only 209,738 persons. This population size is one-half of the population of the city in the 2010 CPH.

Among the 180 barangays comprising Iloilo City, barangay Calumpang was the most populous. Its population size was 2.6 percent of the total population of the city. San Juan came in second in terms of population size, with 2.3 percent share. This was followed by Balabago and Tabuc Suba (Jaro) with 2.0 percent each, Calaparan and So-oc with 1.9 percent each, Molo Boulevard with 1.8 percent, Santo Niño Sur with 1.7 percent, Cubay and Obrero-Lapuz with 1.6 percent each, and Bolilao with 1.5 percent. The rest of the barangays contributed less than 1.5 percent each.
 
The least populated barangay was Roxas Village with less than 0.1 percent share to the total population of the city. It was also the least populated barangay in 2000.

Religion 

As the second National Shrine in the Visayas and Mindanao (first in Western Visayas and second Marian dedicated church to do so in Visayas and Mindanao), Jaro Metropolitan Cathedral is widely known as the seat of Roman Catholicism in Western Visayas.

Iloilo City is one of the notable centers of faith in the Philippines. Due to the heavy religions missions during the 300 years of Spanish colonialization, the city's population is predominant Catholic with over 90% belonging to the Roman Catholic Church. Other religious minorities such as Protestants (5%), Iglesia ni Cristo (2%) and Aglipayans (1%) (also a form of Episcopal Anglo-Catholicism) have a significant presence at the city.

The former city of Jaro (one of the present districts (boroughs) of Iloilo City) is the seat of bishopric and pioneer Christian institutions not only in Western Visayas but in the whole Philippines established through the Spanish colonization. The Spaniards which brought the Catholic faith established the Roman Catholic metropolitan see of the Archdiocese of Jaro with its diocesan cathedral while the Americans which brought the Protestantism established the Convention of Philippine Baptist Churches (the first and oldest Baptist churches organization in the Philippines), the Jaro Evangelical Church (the first Baptist church in the Philippine islands), and Jaro Adventist Center (first organized Adventist church in the Philippines).

The Roman Catholic Archdiocese is one of the oldest and largest bishopric sees in the country. It was established as a parish in 1587 initially covering Catmon, Cabatuan and Maasin. It was created a diocese by virtue of a papal bull of Pope Pius IX on May 27, 1865. It has jurisdiction over sufragan bishops of Mindoro, Palawan, Zamboanga, the province of Iloilo, Negros Oriental, Guimaras, San Jose de Buenavista, Capiz, Bacolod, San Carlos and Kabankalan in Negros Occidental.

It lost some of its territory to establish the Diocese of Zamboanga and Apostolic Prefecture of Palawan. Much later, three other ecclesiastical jurisdictions were established from parts of its territory: Diocese of Bacolod (July 15, 1932), Apostolic Prefecture of Mindoro (July 2, 1936), and Diocese of Capiz (January 27, 1951). The diocese was elevated into a Metropolitan Archdiocese by Pope Pius XII. Later, on March 24, 1962, it lost further some of its territory that resulted to the establishment the Territorial Prelature of San Jose de Antique (but still a part of it at present).

The Jaro Cathedral (National Shrine of the Our Lady of Candles) is the seat of the Archdiocese of Jaro. Saint Elizabeth of Hungary and the Our Lady of Candles is the official Catholic patronesses of the Archdiocese. The Nuestra Señora de la Candelaria or Our Lady of the Candles is the official patron of the whole Western Visayas and Romblon.

Being designated as a National Shrine, Jaro Cathedral is likewise widely known as the seat of Roman Catholicism in Western Visayas. The said designation (National Shrine) by the Catholic Bishops Conference of the Philippines is the first of its kind in the region, the second in the Visayas (after Cebu), and the first Marian-dedicated church outside of Luzon.

Protestantism formed as the second-largest faith in the City of Iloilo. Protestant sects were brought by the Americans when the Philippines was ceded to American rule by Spain through the 1898 Treaty of Paris.

The said faith brought by the United States in the heavily Roman Catholic Iloilo has gained adherents and still continues to grow at present. Iloilo which is one of the pioneering places in the country where Protestants set foot strongly contributed due to its economic importance on the international scene in the early 1900s. The American colonial government tolerated religious freedom that even to this day Iloilo is still predominantly Catholic.

Presbyterians and Baptists are among the first Protestant sects that arrived in Iloilo. The arrival of the American Protestant denominations resulted in the establishment of notable pioneering institutions in Iloilo. The Presbyterians established the Iloilo Mission Hospital in 1901 (the first American and Protestant hospital in the Philippines) while Baptists established the American John D. Rockefeller-funded Central Philippine University in 1905 (the first Baptist and second American university in the Philippines and in Asia), Jaro Evangelical Church in 1900 (the first Baptist church in the Philippines and also the first Protestant church outside Manila (2nd in the Philippines after the Central United Methodist Church in Manila), and the Convention of Philippine Baptist Churches (the first and oldest Baptist churches organized in the Philippines).

The Seventh-day Adventists did not join the comity agreement with the early Protestant sects for jurisdictional division on the Philippine islands for missionary works, because they wanted to go to any parts of the country. They arrived years later following the advent of Protestant missions in the Philippines in the early 1900s in Iloilo. Their arrival resulted in the founding of Jaro Adventist Center, the first organized Seventh-day Adventist church outside Manila.

There are other Christian sects such as Iglesia ni Cristo and Church of Christ of Latter Day Saints or Mormon and communities of non-Christian sects like Islam which brought by Muslim-Filipinos from the south, Sikhism by the Indian immigrants, and Taoism and Buddhism which brought by Chinese immigrants.

Economy 

Iloilo City is a hub for trade, commerce, finance, technology, medical tourism, hospitality, real estate, tourism, education, and industry in the Western Visayas region. Major industries in the city include management of port facilities, telecommunications infrastructure and utilities, banking and finance, retail trading, real estate, tourism and business process outsourcing. The local government has provided incentives to businesses in certain investment areas, such as income tax holidays and free issuance of permits and licenses. It is the home of Mang Inasal, headquartered in Iloilo.

During the Spanish colonial period, sugar was the main export product of Iloilo. The said industry brought immense wealth to the city alongside when its port was opened to the international trade. As a result, known and old-rich families' wealth was propelled by sugarcane plantations. It yielded affluent clans that are known in the region and the country up to today, which originated in Iloilo—Lacson, Locsin, Ledesma, Montinola, Lopez, to name a few. After World War II, the sugar industry in Iloilo waned, and the importance of the city as the second most important economic center next to Manila diminished.

It was in the 21st century that economic activity in Iloilo flourished after years that it slept in the corner. The opening of the Iloilo International Airport in 2007, which replaced the old Iloilo Airport in Mandurriao, paved the way for the city to prosper. The acquisition of the old airport after it was decommissioned and the construction of a business park on its site by the real estate giant Megaworld Corporation, became a catalyst for some land developers to invest in Iloilo.

As a thriving economic hub in the Western Visayas region, an adequate and growing number of banks establishing branches leads the metropolis as the city with the most bank savings deposits and accounts in the Western Visayas region (third in the Philippines); the modernly built Iloilo International Airport is the fifth busiest airport in the country; the Port of Iloilo, which is one of the historical ports in the Philippine islands, is now one of the busiest ports and natural harbors in the country by terms of passenger movement and cargo handling; and with the on-going building construction boom, especially in the real estate and retail sectors. Iloilo City has the lowest crime rate in the Philippines, the lowest level of corruption, the highest life expectancy in Visayas and Mindanao, a large concentration of middle class, ranks first in the happiness index, and the most business-friendly city.

Trade and industry 

There were 8,407 business establishments as of December 2003 in Iloilo City, of which 1,182 are new. Total capital investments for new business establishments is P365,506,020.92. However, both new and renewed capital investments for the year 2003 amounted to ₱13.02 billion. Of the employed person by type of industry from primary occupation 82% belongs to service sector, 14% belongs industry sector and only 4% are in agriculture (as of April 2003 FIES, NSO). Average annual family income (at current prices) is P 283,604 or a percentage increase of 32.3 between 1994 and 1997 while Average Annual Family Expenditures is P 226,887 or a 25.6% increase (2000 FIES).

Average per Capita Income is P 65,136 and Average Per Capita Expenditures is P 51,557 (FIES 2000). Average Inflation Rate is 3.2, the Average Purchasing Power of the Peso is 0.62 and the Average Consumer Price Index (CPI) is 162.6 in 2003. (Source: NSO, Prices Section).

Banking and finance 

The banking industry in Iloilo dates back during the Spanish times. The establishment of banks during such time is hinge to Iloilo's importance as an international gateway when its port was open for foreign ships to dock in, and the sugar-boom. The first Banco Español-Filipino (now Bank of the Philippines), opened its first branch outside of Manila in Iloilo. The first Philippine National Bank branch outside Manila also opened in the city. With that, there are also international banks implying the city's importance in banking history in the Philippines, that opened in Iloilo during Spanish-American times that ceased their operations in the city: the Hong Kong and Shanghai Banking Corporation (HSBC), first HSBC branch outside Manila; and Standard Chartered (first Standard Chartered Bank branch outside Manila).

At present, Iloilo ranks 3rd in the country as the city with most deposits or savings account, fueled by OFW remittances, IT-BPO industry, and the local industries. The surge of microfinancial and other lending institutions in the city has also sprouted. It is the headquarters of LifeBank MFI, the Iloilo's largest homegrown microfinancial institution (3rd largest microfinancial institution in the country) with ~500 branches across the Philippines.

Queen City Development Bank (QueenBank) which is owned by the Florete Group, is one of the founding member of Megalink (the first bank outside of Manila to become a member of it) has its headquarters and 1st branch in Iloilo City.

Tourism 

As a gateway to the Western Visayan region, tourism plays a major part as a catalyst in contributing to Iloilo City's economy. The metropolis hosts notable festivals which entice thousands of tourists annually especially during the Dinagyang, Paraw Regatta (Asia's oldest sailing event), and Fiesta de Candelaria festivals seasons. Iloilo City's bannered monickers like "City of Love" and "City of Mansions" and intensified local government's programs such as beautification of major thoroughfares in the city and building of parks, has played a role in attracting local and foreign visitors also. There are myriad of selections of attractions in the city that tourists can visit – heritage landmarks, museums, art galleries, parks, and restaurants, to name a few. Nightlife in the metro with Smallville Complex as the mecca for party-goers is flocked by revellers every night especially on Friday and weekends.

A well known Philippine heritage city built during the Spanish era, heritage tourism adds also to the city's charm which magnets visitors. Centuries old churches, old edifices and mansions of well known Ilonggo families, magnets sightseers from different places who wants to discover Iloilo City's rich and glorious past. Iloilo City is also respected gastronomic capital with famous dishes originated in the area that gained popularity throughout the country – La Paz Batchoy, Pancit Molo, Kansi, Laswa, and KBL (Kadyos, Baboy kag Langka).

In 2018 alone, the widespread promotions of Iloilo City paid off as it attracted the highest tourist arrivals in Western Visayas, posting 1,242,087 total arrivals including 1,154,550 domestic visitors; 70,787 foreign guests, and 16,750 overseas workers. Following in 2019, it garnered an 11.59% increase in the previous year's data. In 2020, the city again achieved its target with 1.4 million arrivals.

Information technology 

The IT-BPO and KPO industry has spurred employment in the metropolis. IT-BPO and KPO locators are attracted to Iloilo because of the literacy rate and the number of graduates per year. With continuous influx of business process outsourcing (BPO) and knowledge process outsourcing (KPO) industry, Iloilo has fast becoming a "Silicon Valley" backed by its political leaders. BPO investors are attracted to Iloilo due to stable energy source, availability of building spaces, high number of graduates and English Proficiency.

Megaworld's Iloilo Business Park – One Global Center, Two Global Center, and Three Techno Place are Iloilo operation sites of Transcom Asia, StarTek, WNS Global and Convergent powered by Nearsol, respectively. While Richmonde Tower is where Reed Elsevier is operates. Other IT-BPO and KPO locators are Callbox (the largest homegrown IT-BPO company in Iloilo),  (a Philadelphia, Pennsylvania, U.S. based IT & BPM/BPO company), Telus International, Legato Health Technologies (now Carelon Global Solutions), Asurion, Conectys, TeleTech Holdings, Inc., Crawford & Company, Savant Technologies (A non-voice KPO and BPO company), Eversun Philippines (a non voice KPO and BPO), Reed Elsevier, SPI-Global (Now Inspiro), Sagility, WorldSource Inc., Vista Health Solutions, Xilium Professional Services, WNS, Hinduja Global Solutions, iXL Solution, RS2, Prosync (Process Synergy), Trusttel Customer Care, OneVirtual Global Business Solutions, Medrisk, Bluu Qatar Philippines, POWRD Solutions, iQor Iloilo, Accentline, Voiceless Technologies (Now Leadgen), Atento, HealthyBOS, XtendOps (Extend BPO), and Yazaki-Philippine EDS Techno Service.

Inspiro (formerly SPI Global and PLDT E-Ventus) and Callbox are the two pioneering IT-BPO companies that first set their foot in Iloilo City.

 (FTO), a United States based IT-BPO company headquartered in Philadelphia, Pennsylvania opened its first global site in Iloilo (now its Philippine operations headquarters) in October 2015 as MODph. It was renamed Rethink Staffing in August 2016 and eventually to its present name in February 2018, Fair Trade Outsourcing. From a 300-600 employee size company it continued to grow and has now a workforce of 1000+ staff. It opened two more sites in the metro to buffer up its global expansion, the Iloilo – Molo, and Iloilo – Guanco sites. Other than Iloilo it has sites in Bacolod (Doña Juliana Avenue) and in Davao (MetroLifestyle Complex across the Department of Education Regional Office XI). Outside the Philippines, it operates in Accra in Ghana; and Guadalajara and Chihuahua in Mexico.

 (FTO) plans to open new sites in Colombia (Medellin) and Kenya, and another one in Ghana. In November 2022, company opened its 2nd site in the United States in McAllen, Texas.

The Department of Science and Technology-Information and Communications Technology Office (DOST-ICTO) and Business Processing Association of the Philippines (BPAP) has named Iloilo City one of the next wave cities.

Iloilo City is a  "City of Excellence" as it rivals the cities of Manila and Cebu in terms of economic progress. It has also a number of IT/BPO and KPO centers except for the ones in Iloilo Business Park, and among them is the Ayala Techno Hub Iloilo, Amigo Plaza Mall, SM City Iloilo, and Plazuela de Iloilo.

Some of the known IT/BPO centers in Iloilo Business Park, both by Megaworld Corporation while the Iloilo City Center by the Gaisano Group has business process outsourcing (BPO) office buildings undergoing construction for future IT-BPO and KPO locators occupancy.

Shopping and retail 

As the shopping hub of Western Visayas, retail industry has a big relevant presence in Iloilo City since Spanish and American colonial times. Proliferated after Philippines gained Independence from United States of America.

In 1877, the first department store in the Philippines was Hoskyn Department Store started at  Calle Real (or Royal Street) which stretches from Plaza Libertad to Plazoleta Gay. It was first to employ the "fixed pricing" for its commodities in merchandising. Since it was  "the store that sold everything from needle to anchor", people of Iloilo and even Bacolod flocked buying from its goods such as English wool imported from England. It offered groceries, hardware, stationery, toys, watches, jewelry, machinery, buttons, threads, etc. It was described as "a great store" and "the best in the islands", Dauncey recounted how she bought "pieces of furniture, some groceries, china, glass, and so forth" from Hoskyn's "at low prices, as they have such an immense business, even being able to compete with the shops in Manila..." by Enid Rolanda Dauncey, wife of Iloilo-based British businessman Campbell Dauncey, in her 1906 memoirs "An Englishwoman in the Philippines". "It has long been a commercial landmark in the Bisayas, people call on it for everything and always get what they want," incorporated in 1925. After the World War II, Que Family acquired Hoskyns and renaimed it to " Washington Commercial "  as their second store. They have "Washington Grocery" in Iznart Street. Subsequently, it was renamed "Washington Supermart".

Marymart Shopping Center opened in 1972 in called Weyler ( renamed later as Valeria (Ledesma), owner of the land) by Jamora Brothers. Henry Sy purchased land an adjacent lot in Valeria and founded the SM Iloilo now called SM Delgado, is the first SM outside Manila, which started operating in 1979 while Cebu only opened 14 years after in 1993 and Bacolod in 2007.  In 1993, Jimenez family sold their property and Atrium Shopping Center was opened beside Caza Plaza Hotel. It was first shopping center to have a combination of hotel, restobar, Saloon, Supermarket and Restaurants in the whole Philippines.

With the growing demand of consumerism and real estate, Philippine companies such as – SM Prime Holdings, Robinsons Land Corporation, Megaworld Corporation, and Ayala has fueled the popularity of mall culture in Iloilo.

SM City Iloilo by SM Prime Holdings, the largest SM Supermall in Western Visayas (one of the largest in the Philippines); Robinsons Place Iloilo and Robinsons Place Jaro – both by Robinsons Land Corporation; &  by Megaworld Corporation's – Festive Walk Iloilo, the first (full-scale) Megaworld Lifestyle Mall outside Luzon and Festive Walk Parade, the longest dining strip in the Philippines.

Government

Iloilo City is the regional capital of Western Visayas region and the provincial capital of Iloilo province. It is one of the important economic centers in the Philippines and regional and provincial offices of national government agencies has offices in the city. It is classified as a first income class and highly urbanized city (HUC). Due to such status and classification, it is independent from the province of Iloilo, thus its citizens does not have the power to elect for political provincial officials.

The city dates back its founding in 1566 through a settlement established by the Spaniards in the areas of Oton and Villa de Arevalo and received its cityhood status thrice – first on October 5, 1889 (effectivity in 1890) through a Spanish royal decree issued by the Queen Regent of Spain, Maria Christina, secondly in 1893 through a legal declaration by the virtue of Bacura/Becerra Law ratifying the first royal decree and establishing the city government of Iloilo, and the third through a virtue of Commonwealth Act No. 158 on July 16, 1937, formally inaugurated on August 25, 1937, as a chartered city, by consolidating the existing City of Iloilo with the towns of Arevalo, Mandurriao, Molo, and La Paz, while the City of Jaro was officially annexed on January 7, 1941, through the virtue of Commonwealth Act No. 604 of August 22, 1940, issued by President Manuel L. Quezon. By such decrees, the City of Iloilo is the first legal city in the Philippines because no law ratifies and established by the government that creates and enacts an edict declaring or elevating a town into a status of a city during Spanish and early American colonial periods.

The city acquired its royal title "La Muy Leal y Noble Ciudad" (The Most Loyal and Noble City) on March 1, 1898, given by Queen Regent Maria Christina of Spain due to the loyalty stand by the Ilonggos to the Spanish crown during the Philippine war of independence. It is likewise one of the few Spanish Royal Cities in the Philippines during the Spanish colonial era in the Philippines.

The Mayor of Iloilo City (Alcalde) is the chief executive and is assisted by the vice mayor (vice-alcalde) which governs the city. The city is also represented by a congressman in the House of Representatives of the Philippines. The Iloilo City Council (Filipino: Sangguniang Panglungsod ng Iloilo and Spanish: Consejo de Ciudad de Iloilo) is the local legislative assembly. Its 15-member council is elected concurrently with general elections, held at the same time with the national elections including for the city and vice mayors. The Council convenes every month at the Iloilo City Hall (Ayuntamiento de Iloílo), and the meetings are open to the public. The matters on which the councillors decide have generally already been drafted and discussed by various boards and committees.

Iloilo city is sub-divided into 180 barangays or "barrios" each govern by a Barangay Captain or Chairman held through a national barangay election.

In 1955, through the efforts for a liberal appointing of a new city mayor, Rodolfo Ganzon became the first mayor that won through a popular election process. Ganzon is widely remembered by his constituents for having authored and sponsored the Iloilo City Freedom Law which restored to the people of Jaro, La Paz, Molo, Arevalo, Manduriao and Iloilo City proper their constitutional right to elect their own mayor, vice mayor and 10 councilors.

Culture

Cultures and traditions has a crucial role that shaped Iloilo's cultural and heritage sphere apart from the being the Regional Center of the Western Visayas region. Cultural and heritage consciousness is held in much broad public attention and fervor among the various stakeholders with the help of the government. Iloilo holds many cultural institutions especially national ones and heritage houses and mansions that contributed to Iloilo's long held monikers as "Museum City of the Philippines" and the "City of Mansions."

Museums

The city has a number of museums ranging from fields of ancient and contemporary art, cultural and economic history to science. Museums and art galleries are the repositories of Iloilo's rich and glorious history and culture. Various notable Philippine artists trace their roots from Iloilo. Unearthed artifacts like potteries, porcelain, gold and plates had been excavated in many parts of Iloilo predating Spanish Era are now showcased in various museums in Iloilo.

Collaborative efforts of the city government with various stakeholders to uplift the cultural cognizance of the Ilonggo people led to the establishment of the Western Visayas Regional Museum of the National Museum of the Philippines in the restored and adoptive reuse of old Iloilo Provincial Jail and their regional headquarters in the restored old Municipio de Jaro (Jaro Municipal Hall). There are other museums that showcase memorabilias of notable person and families, artworks and artifacts.

The other notable museums and art galleries in the city in which some are under some academic institutions which include the Museo Iloilo (the first government built museum outside Manila); Museum of Philippine Economic History; Iloilo Museum of Contemporary Art (housed at the Casa de Emperador at Iloilo Business Park);  The Henry Luce III (Museum and Library) of Central Philippine University, University of San Agustin Museum, UPV Art Gallery, John B. Lacson Foundation Museum of Maritime Culture and Craft, Rosendo Mejica Museum, among others.

The Iloilo Museum of Contemporary Art (ILOMOCA), the first museum project of the property giant Megaworld Corporation, is the first museum dedicated to modern and contemporary art in Visayas and Mindanao. The museum of 3,000 square meters of space is housed at the Casa de Emperador which includes five exhibit rooms and souvenir and merchandise shop. The ground floor is The Hulot Exhibit which showcase exhibits of local and international artists. Works by notable and renowned international artists like Salvador Dalí, Marc Chagall, and Joan Miró are exhibit in some of its art collections.

The Museum of Philippine Economic History, the first economic history museum in the Philippines, has a wide array of exhibits and collections showcasing the economic history of the Philippine throughout the different colonial eras. The structure, restored by the National Historical Commission of the Philippines and where the museum is housed is formerly owned by one of the country's biggest trading firms, the Ynchausti y Compania, of the Familia Ynchausti. The firm's name was synonymous with its products like Yco Floor Wax, Tanduay and Yco Paints. The museum has 13 galleries throughout the 2 storey structure.

The location of the Museum of Philippine Economic History in Iloilo City is due to the city and province being called the Queen City of the South during the Spanish and early American colonial era because of its economic importance next to Manila.

Other than the hundred decades-old artifacts and items on display at the Philippine Museum of Economic History, visitors can find in the museum looms from the oldest weavers of Miag-ao in Iloilo, which was known then as the Textile Capital of the Philippines, and also showcases artifacts coming from other regions such as T'nalak from Mindanao and decades-old gold, necklace and other accessories from Pampanga; old photographs and maps, and other interesting remnants of the past.

The Henry Luce III (Library and Museum) on Central Philippine University's main campus which was built through a benevolent grant given by the Henry Luce Foundation though Henry Luce III, the eldest son of the founder of Time Inc. Henry Luce. It holds an array of special museum collections categorized into various sections and types of collections – Meyer Asian Collection, the Elizabeth Knox Sacred Music Collection, rare collections of Second World War documents, Asian archaeological artifacts and historical exhibits, and artworks from known artists. A Henry Luce III (the main library of CPU Library system) sole book holding implies it as the largest library in the Western Visayas region.

Festivals

The Ilonggos cultural identity is deeply rooted and influenced by the Hispanic culture. Iloilo is known as Festival(s) Capital of the Philippines with various renowned festivals in the country celebrated in the city showcasing the city's rich cultural and historical past. Iloilo is highlighted with various festivals in which big three is Dinagyang Festival – held every fourth Sunday of January in honor of the Holy Child Jesus (Santo Niño de Jesus) in a venerated image of Santo Niño de Cebu.

The Jaro Fiesta (Fiesta de Jaro) or Fiesta de Nuestra Señora de la Candelaria (Fiesta de Candelaria) which is held every February 2 in honor of Nuestra Señora de la Candelaria (Virgin of Candelaria) the patron of Western Visayas and Romblon, is the largest marian dedicated festival outside Luzon.

Jaro Fiesta is famous for its pomp and pageantry. The fiesta chooses its annual Reyna del Fiesta de Jaro or Jaro Carnival Queen from among the maiden member of prominent and notable old-rich Spanish-Filipino or wealthy families of the town. The annual fiesta includes a cockfighting held during the fiesta day (largest cockfighting competition in the Philippines) at the Iloilo Coliseum and an agro-industrial and charity fair in Plaza Jaro which starts from September and a week after the fiesta day.

Iloilo with its number of mainland Chinese expatriates who came for trading and settled in the city hundreds of years ago, celebrates the annual Iloilo Chinese Lunar New Year. It is considered as the largest Chinese New Year celebration outside Binondo, Manila, the oldest Chinatown in the world.

In contrast with the city's celebration of the annual Chinese New Year, Iloilo with the advent of Chinese settlers before or during the Spanish Colonial period, settled in what is now the Molo District or Parian, a town established for Sangleyes or Chinese Ilonggos by the Spanish colonial government. Though only a town where Chinese people were organized to settle, Molo is considered as second-oldest Chinatown after Binondo, Manila.

During the holiday season after the all saints (Dia de Todos Los Santos) and all souls days (Dia de los Muertos), various landmarks such as schools are adorned with yuletide lights spectacles. Flocked during its opening night in the first week of December by thousands of spectators, the annual Festival of Lights and Music at Central on the campus of Central Philippine University is the longest running university based Christmas festival of lights in the Western Visayas region since 1991. Trees, major edifices, and places of interests like the CPU Church on the university's 24 hectare main campus in Jaro, Iloilo City are festooned with holiday lights and displays of Christmas icons like Santa Claus, Nativity Scene, and Pasko sa Nayon. It is opened to the public until every January 6 of the next year. Carnival rides, a Christmas Bazaar and food stalls are also found catering to the tourists visiting the campus of the university in the said event.

Paraw Regatta, which is also one of the main festivals of Iloilo and held every February, is the sailing event in Asia (oldest traditional boat sailing event in Asia). The festivities during the said festival includes Samba de Regatta, Miss Paraw Regatta pageant, Lighted Paraw and the annual Paraw Regatta sailing competition held in La Villa Rica de Arevalo (Villa de Arevalo)

In thrive for the city's endeavor as the Art Capital of the Philippines, the Iloilo Summer Arts Festival was launched in 2020 which runs from April to May. The latest addition to such venture is the Iloilo Arts Festival which opened in December 2021. It is a nearly a month long event showcasing the best of Ilonggo artistry in visual arts exhibited in notable city museums and performing arts in theaters across the metropolis.

Public arts

The local government has initiated efforts to promote the city as the "Art Capital of the Philippines". It has established several programs through the help of local artists like turning the blank and public spaces in the metropolis as canvasses for murals and paintings depicting the city's rich history and culture.

A fine example of this is the 3D Mural depicting the Dinagyang warriors dancing in the street in Iloilo River Esplanade 1. Real estate developers also play a role in supporting such programs by rolling out plans to elevate the cultural consciousness of the Ilonggos through public art displays and mural paintings.

Entertainment, film and performing arts

The colonial influence of Spanish and American culture has created an imprint in the entertainment, performing arts, and film sectors and scenes in Iloilo. The city and province has produced a notable people in the field of cinema and entertainment. The arts and entertainment sectors in Iloilo flourished during the time when Iloilo was opened to international trade when the Puerto de Iloilo (Port of Iloilo) was opened to foreign ships to dock from different countries. The annual Iloilo Film Festival, which is held during the Dinagyang Festival, has a plethora of films being screened during the festival's event.

The Iloilo Convention Center is a state-of-the-art convention center located in the Iloilo Business Park by Megaworld Corporation in Mandurriao. Its construction was completed in September 2015 in time for the APEC 2015. It is a two-story structure with a total floor area of 11,832 square meters. The main hall on the ground floor has a 3,700-seat capacity and 500-seat function rooms on the second floor. A rooftop of 1,500 sqm is available for outdoor functions.

The convention center was designed by Ilonggo architect William Coscolluela. The design was inspired by Iloilo's Dinagyang and Paraw Regatta festivals.

Iloilo has various facilities also for international and local musical, band, and solo performances or concerts. Rose Memorial Auditorium or Rose on Central Philippine University's main campus is the largest and notable auditorium or theater Western Visayas region. It hosted concerts held by famous Filipino and international singers, bands and cultural groups and is also the venue of the annual national Bombo Music Festival that draws homegrown music artists from all over the Philippines.

The auditorium is a 2-storey structure and can occupy or has a maximum capacity of 4,000+ spectators. Rose Memorial along with Central Philippine University has been and is the only theater/auditorium and university in the Western Visayas region that has been designated (one of the first batch of nine) Cultural Center of the Philippines Regional Art Centers (or Kaisa sa Sining Regional Art Centers) in 2014 in the whole Philippines.

There had been old cinema theaters in the old central business district of Calle Real, but they do not now operate because of the development of modern shopping malls with cinemas in the metropolis which replaced their once and glorious days in the heritage zone of Calle Real in the city center. Modern day cinemas in the metropolis screens with a wide array of present-day films both national and from foreign countries. The arts and entertainment initiatives with the Film Development Council of the Philippines under the office of the Philippine President city has established its presence in the city as the regional cultural and arts center of Western Visayas through the establishment of Cinematheque theater which showcases various screened films.

Cultural representations in the perspective of performing and visual arts holds numerous concerts throughout the year with some showcased by universities cultural groups and organizations in the city.

University's in Iloilo on the other hand, has a vital role with various established cultural and art groups that gain foothold that held and performed in various cultural performances nationally and internationally in which some are sponsored National Cultural government agencies. The University of San Agustin has established the USA Troubadours while Central Philippine University the CPU Bahandi Singers, CPU Handbell Choir (the first 8 octave handbell choir in the Philippines) and the CPU Sari-Saot Dance Troupe.

Cuisine 

With Iloilo being hailed as the Food Haven of the Philippines, its local cuisines are well-loved and recognized by many Filipinos across the country, including from different parts of the world. Food in Iloilo is a blend of east-and-west due to the contact of locals with the foreign cultures because of Iloilo's central most location and one of the most important port cities in the Philippines. The three hundred years of Spanish influence in the Iloilo's culture left a heavy imprint in the Ilonggo cuisine that resulted to the cuisines that are the same with other Hispanic influenced countries like Menudo, Afritada, Lechon, Adobo, Estofado, among others.  Because of Ilonggos roots as Asians, rice is a staple diet food, and is usually served plain with other dishes.

The city has a variety of restaurants specialized in serving foreign cuisines (Italian, American, Japanese, Chinese, Vietnamese, German, and Thai cuisines). The rise of international and luxury hotels brought high-end buffet and exclusive dining experience to tourists and locals.

Chinese influenced played also a vital role in influencing the Ilonggo cuisine and because of it, famous dishes like the La Paz Batchoy and Pancit Molo born-out because of such influence which became well known throughout the Philippines that originated from Iloilo. Notable Chinese restaurants in the city include Roberto's and Kong Kee.

Iloilo has also been the founding location of the first branch of Mang Inasal fast-food chain of restaurants in the country. It was founded by Edgar Sia, a Japanese-Chinese-Filipino businessman in 2003 and has expanded with its opening of branches throughout the Philippines.

La Paz Batchoy is one of Iloilo's signature dishes, a delicacy served in restaurants all over Iloilo City. The said noodle soup is made with miki, (round noodles), pork organs (liver, spleen, kidneys and heart), chicken stock, beef loin, shrimp stock, and garnished with chicharon (pork cracklings). It is best eaten at the batchoyan (batchoy stalls) in La Paz Market where it originated. The most famous places to eat batchoy are Ted's, Deco's, Netong's, and Inggo's. The "original" creator of the dish is not certain, but you may judge for yourself which among them serves the tastiest. When served with a bowl of batchoy, most Ilonggos would finish the kaldo (broth) first. It is customary to request additional refills of kaldo before finishing the meal.

The Spanish influence brought baking techniques to the locals which established century-old notable baking institutions in which Iloilo is famous for – Panaderia ni Paa (founded in the 1900s) and Deocampo: The Original Barquillos (Los Barquillos Originales) (founded in the 1800s) are both located in Jaro and Panaderia de Molo (founded in the 1800s) in Molo. Sweet delicacies like Biscocho and Barquillos  are one of the innumerable influences of the Spaniards. Barquillos is a thin rolled cookies while Biscocho is a hardened baked sliced bread with milk and margarine. In the whole archipelago of the Philippines, Iloilo stands out for serving the first and most popular barquillos and biscocho.

Media 

The city and the province of Iloilo is served by mostly tabloid-type English newspapers such as Panay News, The Daily Guardian, News Express, and Sunstar Iloilo. Hublas of Panay News is the sole Hiligaynon tabloid newspaper. Iloilo has a glossy full color lifestyle magazine named Cream Magazine published monthly since 1989.

Iloilo City is the main headquarters of Bombo Radyo Philippines, which owns Bombo Radio AM stations and Star FM stations across the country. Being the urban center of the province, most of the AM and FM radio stations serve the province of Iloilo and Guimaras, mostly local stations of national radio stations.

Television arrived in the city in 1964 when DYAF-TV began airing, serving Iloilo City and the neighboring towns in the province. In 1998, with the frequency transfer to Channel 10, ABS-CBN separated its news team from the Bacolod news team and launched TV Patrol Iloilo (today TV Patrol Panay). In 1967, TV-6 Iloilo (a TV5 affiliate) stated its initial broadcast in Jaro, Iloilo City. By 1974 it changed its affiliation to GMA Network as their local television station. The channel started upgrading its facilities and relocated their TV tower to Guimaras and began serving Iloilo City, Panay and Guimaras, as well as some parts of Negros Occidental in 1998. Studio 23 Iloilo (UHF 38) (changed its name to ABS-CBN Sports and Action on January 18, 2014) initiated its broadcast in 1999. The government television station, PTV (VHF 2) in 1992 and IBC (VHF 12) in 1977 are also broadcasting local programs for Iloilo. In the first quarter of 2010, QTV-28 Iloilo (UHF 28) (changed its name to GMA News TV on February 28, 2011) and UNTV-42 (UHF 42) commenced operations in the city. In second quarter of 2012, TV5 Iloilo (UHF 36) and AksyonTV Iloilo (UHF 46) commenced operation, serving the southern part of Western Visayas that includes southern Panay, Iloilo City and Guimaras, also formerly, Negros Occidental, and at the same time started its News5 team coverage. In 1995, RMN launch a UHF TV CTV (Cinema Television) and Iloilo UHF 26 was born. It started its initial broadcast with limited coverage area. In 1997, RMN 26 rebrand to E! Philippines with general entertainment format. But in 2003, RMN cease it operations. Until BEAM an affiliate of RMN return to test broadcast on July 3, 2010, and rebrand to BEAM TV. In 2012, BEAM TV 26 relocate its transmitter to Jordan, Guimaras from RMN Broadcast Center in Lapaz, Iloilo City, and increase its transmitting power from 500 watts to current power 5,000watts in analog and during that time also initial broadcast its digital terrestrial television at UHF 42 with the power of 1,000 watts.

Nicknames 

Like the country's capital, Manila, Iloilo City is recognized by a number of nicknames, aliases, sobriquets, and slogans, both present and past. Though it is now more widely known as the City of Love, it was once renowned as the Queen City of the South. The city's official moniker is La Muy Leal y Noble Ciudad (Most Loyal and Noble City), which is also depicted on the city's official seal.

 Most Loyal and Noble City (Spanish: La Muy Leal y Noble Ciudad), the royal title acquired on March 1, 1898, after being given by Queen Regent Maria Christina of Spain. This is an inscription in the city's coat of arms from the royal decree of 1896 in recognition of the people's loyalty to the Spanish crown. A replica of the Spanish crown architectural structure can be seen in the present Arevalo district of the city.
 Queen City of the South (Spanish: La Reina Ciudad del Sur), initially the Queen's City in the South, an honor it earned after being Queen Regent Maria Christina's favorite city in the capital's south. At the turn of the 20th century, the title evolved to what is now known as the Queen City of the South, after the city became second to the country's primate city of Manila in terms of economic importance. Following the city's economic downfall in the mid-1900s as a result of World War II destruction, Cebu City also adopted the title. City officials, however, disagree with Cebu's claim because the title is historically significant to Iloilo alone, and not for which city is the next country's second-largest economic center.
 City of Love (Hiligaynon: Siyudad sang Paghigugma), also the Asia's City of Love, referring to the city's citizens' Ilonggo accents, which are very soothing to the ears, as well as their well-known presumption of being the most loving, friendly, kind-hearted, and soft-spoken Filipinos. The city's great river and old architectural structures also lend the city's romantic ambiance.
 Textile Capital of the Philippines (Spanish: Capital Textil de Filipinas), referring to the development of a large-scale weaving industry that started in Iloilo and its surge in trade and economy in the Visayas in the late 18th century. Sinamay, piña, and jusi are some examples of the products produced by the looms of Iloilo and were exported to Manila and other foreign places.
 Heart of the Philippines, referring to the city's human heart-shaped territory as well as its geographical location at the center of the Philippine archipelago. The main flagpole of the  Central Philippine University (CPU) in Jaro district is considered the center of the Philippines by longitude and latitude.
 Royal City of the South (Spanish: Ciudad Real del Sur), in reference to the city's being a royal Spanish city in the south of the capital, Manila, during the Spanish colonial era in the Philippines.
 City of Mansions, in reference to the city's being home to many well-preserved heritage houses built by the hacienderos and sugar barons way back in the pre-war era.
 Museum City of the Philippines, or simply the Museum City, referring to the city's abundance of historical sites and various types of museums.
 Athens of the Philippines, particularly referring to the Molo district, which produced many of the best political leaders and philosophers in the Philippines.
 Where the Past is Always Present, a recent nickname and tourism slogan coined by the Department of Tourism (DOT) in 2015, in reference to the city's numerous centuries-old houses and buildings that have coexisted with the city's present modern architecture.
 City of Many Firsts, from the information compiled by the late Norberto Baylen of the Visayan Tribune in the 1970s, in reference to the city's many firsts in the country and being a pioneer in many fields.
 Festival Capital of the Philippines, in reference to the city's various popular and innovative festivals, including the Dinagyang and Paraw Regatta festivals, that are flocked and celebrated in the city by the thousands to millions of tourists. Each district in the city also has its own festivals or fiestas, also known as district fiestas, celebrated annually within the district's territory. The most popular one is the Feast of Our Lady of Candles of Jaro district.
 Bike Capital of the Philippines, in reference to the city's having the Philippines' longest protected bike lane, as well as being the most bike-friendly city in the country.
 Food Haven of the Philippines, a new tagline declared by the city council and supported by the Department of Tourism (DOT) in 2021, recognizing the city as a gastronomic hotspot with its dozens of popular local cuisines and dishes, including the La Paz Batchoy and Pancit Molo.

Cityscape

The city's modern-day appearance is shaped by the key role it has played as a trading hub for centuries. Iloilo City has a multitude of districts, each with its distinctive character and representing colonial influence. Iloilo's other distinctive features include its cityscape surrounded with water features such as rivers and is bounded by a sea; bicycle paths and ornamental trees that line most city streets; and its many open spaces, gardens and parks.

Iloilo spreads out with its location in a plain land in south eastern side of Panay Island. It is bounded in the south east side by Iloilo-Guimaras Strait and Guimaras Island which makes the city as a natural harbor for ships. The two main rivers of Iloilo and Batiano snakes through the city and empties out of the Iloilo-Guimaras Strait.

Iloilo is a conglomerate of former separate towns which includes the former city of Jaro established during the Spanish colonial times, thus the layout of the towns civic centers follows a typical Spanish colonial town center composed of a Plaza (Public Square), church, municipal hall and other religious, academic and government instrumentalities offices. A modern development is clustered in an organized form in the city's premises but is strongly concentrated in the Mandurriao district to protect the city's initiatives in protecting the city's skyline, heritage zones and environment. Present modern developments spread out outside the city in neighboring towns that are a part of Metropolitan Iloilo.

Architecture

Iloilo City's urban planning and architecture reflect the plans of the Spanish and the American colonial administrations. Since Iloilo City is a conglomeration of towns, the districts have their own plazas which are surrounded by establishments of political and ecclesiastical influence, such as churches and old administrative halls. In 1930, Juan M. Arellano of the Bureau of Public Works designed the schematic plan for Iloilo City, which was influenced by Ebenezer Howard's "Garden City."

The Spanish colonial influence is strongly imprinted not only in Iloilo's history and cultural background but also the architectural perspective.

The city's regaled status during the Spanish colonial era until the turn of the 20th century is implied during by the sugar boom with ubiquitous stately mansions and edifices built by the old money Ilonggo Sugar Baron and elite families which contrast to the city's economic importance as a second city next to Manila during the said era in the Philippines.  The city's other moniker – City of Mansions  is likewise implied because Iloilo holds 240 mansions in which 30 of it are grand mansions built during the Spanish and American colonial eras.

The ravaged Fuerte de San Pedro (Fort San Pedro) is Iloilo's ground zero as there was no Iloilo City back in the 1600s. As a fortress, Fort San Pedro was built solely by the Spaniards to protect Iloilo from the marauding pirates and privateers. The fort is the second Spanish built fort after the one in Cebu (also Fort San Pedro) in the Philippines and Asia. The foundation of the Fort San Pedro was substantial to the Spanish Empire's stronghold as Panay Island with Iloilo as their second colonial center established through the Iloilo precursor towns of Oton (1566) and La Villa Rica de Arevalo (1581). Oton which was founded as early as 1566 but formally established in 1572 was the actual second seat of Spanish colonial powers but due to pirate attacks, they moved the capital eastward and established the La Villa Rica de Arevalo.

The town of La Villa Rica de Arevalo holds some of the fine example of Spanish built mansions like the mansion of the Spanish Governor General, but were destroyed when the pirates ransacked and destroyed the town. It was in the said frequent events of pirate attacks that the Spaniards moved finally the capital further eastward in the mouth of Rio de Iloilo (Iloilo River) which is flanked and protected by Guimaras Island across it.

It was in the said establishment of the city on the mouth of Iloilo River that as years go by, the city flourished to its heights especially in the economic and regal importance in the Spanish and American eras. La Villa Rica de Arevalo (Arevalo) is the first Spanish named town in the Philippine islands. It is also in Arevalo that the third oldest image of Holy Child Jesus (Señor Santo Niño) in the Philippines was brought by the Spaniards. Notable present-day structures that are repositories that attest to the town's former glory as a Spanish precursor town of Iloilo is the mansion of Camiña Balay nga Bato and the Convento de Arevalo.

During the Spanish and American eras, the city developed its own unique charm that exudes a typical European city in the east which differed it from other cities just like the old Manila in the Philippines. It was in the said eras that architectural perspective of Iloilo flourished with European styled edifices and stately mansions was built which stands of Iloilo's once economic and political importance in its heyday.

Calle Real (Royal Street) which stretches from Plazoleta Gay up to Plaza Alfonso XII (Plaza Libertad) is Iloilo's Escolta (a heritage street in Manila) lined with commercial edifices that possesses European designs. Calle Real is Iloilo's old Central Business District and is considered as the second-most preserved heritage business district in the Philippines. The street during the Iloilo's economic heyday during the late 19th and early 20th centuries when the Puerto de Iloilo (Port of Iloilo) was opened to the international trade is a melting pot and common ground for people of different walks of life, race and color. Stores back then in Calle Real sells luxury goods and items from all over the world.

Iloilo also possesses structures built during the prelude of the American colonial period in the Philippines. Aduana de Iloilo (Iloilo Customs House) and old Iloilo City Hall are notable of the structures built during the said colonial period. Iloilo Customs House, the second-largest customs house after the Aduana in Manila was built the Filipino Architect Juan M. Arellano.

In farther north is the town of Jaro, the largest of all the district of the City of Iloilo. Once a separate city before it merged with the City of Iloilo in the 1940s, is considered as a town of piousness, old rich and grandeur. Many notable Spanish Ilonggos settled and the said area and built their grand mansions and villas. The town's architecture is heavily influenced by the Hispanic and American cultures.

Grand mansions with imposing European styled facades and motifs of 'Buena Familias' or "Old-rich families" (Spanish-Chinese-Filipino families) of Jaro like the Lopez, Ledesma, Lizares, Jalandoni, Javellana and Locsin families that some of it lines the first millionaire row in the Philippine islands still stands to this day. Two of notable mansions that attest to Jaro's importance as an old rich town that developed out of the sugar boom during the Spanish colonial period is the Mansion de Lopez (Lopez Mansion) or Nelly Garden and the beaux-art styled Villa Lizares (Lizares Mansion) which houses at present the Angelicum School Iloilo of the Dominicans.

Religion is also a crucial factor that influenced Jaro's architectural and town plan perspective as it is the cradle of Christian faith in Western Visayas. The Spanish which brought the Roman Catholic faith established the Jaro Cathedral (National Shrine of the Our Lady Candles) with its separate belfry located across it (one of the few churches in the Philippines with a detached belfry) and the Seminario-Colegio de San Vicente Ferrer (the first institution of Higher Learning in Western Visayas). The advent of American colonialization which brought Protestantism has resulted also to the establishment of institutions.

Fine examples of institutions with edifices possessing American architecture and influence includes the Central Philippine University by the Protestant Baptists in 1905 which holds century-old American colonial-styled edifices, the Convention of Philippine Baptist Churches which housed at the European styled former (Rupert) Montinola Mansion in Fajardo, Jaro, and the Jaro Evangelical Church (the first Baptist Church in the Philippine Islands), are among the few of the notable institutions that holds a number of structures that possesses American architectural influence design.

The town of Molo located westward of the "La Punta" (City Proper) is sometimes called "Parian" or Chinese town during the Spanish colonial times. Old rich Molo influential families helped shaped the town's not only economical but political and architectural sphere. The town just like the more Spanish or Mestizo town of Jaro has also a plethora of mansions built by old-rich Chinese-Spanish-Ilonggo Locsin, Lacson, Sayson, Layson and Pison families. The Molo Church "(Iglesia de Santa Ana)" which was built under the supervision of some of the members of notable Molo families like the "Locsins", is the first and only feminist church outside Manila with its imposing façade with gothic influence facing the "Plaza Molo". The "Yusay-Consing" Mansion or Molo Mansion located just across the Plaza Molo and Molo Church was bought by the retail and real estate giant SM Group has been refurbished and restored to its former glory and is now a houses several cultural stores and a mini-museum which exhibits several artworks and native products.

The present economic boom of the 21st century has spurred modern developments across the city. Huge investments of big real estate developers built modern malls and shopping centers, tall and modern edifices and skyscrapers which sprouted up especially in the new city's Central Business Center which occupies a huge land area in the town of Mandurriao. The first tallest skyscraper in Western Visayas, the Injap Tower of the Double Dragon Properties could be found in the area. Hotels and condominiums and tree-lined avenues with jogging and bicycle lanes have also been built during the city's economic renaissance up to the present. The Iloilo's festival inspired iconic Iloilo Convention Center is also located in the Iloilo Business Park.

Sustainability

The city has been a champion in air quality initiatives which further solidified when it won the 2017 Clean Air City Award given by the Clean Air Philippine Movement. The award is given to urban centers and cities whose initiatives in good urban planning is to maintain a good air quality for its citizens to be a more livable and air pollution Philippines cities.

For the second time, Iloilo City has been conferred the Galing Pook Award for its entry the Iloilo Batiano River Development Project. The award recognizes best local government practices worthy of replication by other local government units (LGUs).

The city's government continued initiatives to lessen its impact on the global carbon footprint, resulted in enacting of various environmental laws in the metropolis such as banning of plastic straws in the city, strict compliance of establishments along the stretch of Iloilo river to install waste water treatment facilities, and segregation of bio-degradable and degradable rubbishes. Restaurants such as the ones that are serving fast-food in the city use oxo-degradable plastic bags and recycled paper-boxes. Iloilo City has also tree planting programs such as the government and various stakeholders continued forestation of endemic and ornamental trees along the city's major thoroughfares and mangroves along the city's creeks, estuaries, waterfront areas and rivers.

The Iloilo city government's continued efforts for green sustainability through building of parks, open spaces and making the metropolis clean and conducive to tourists, bagged the city the ASEAN Clean Tourist City award in 2020.

Parks and recreation

The city is endowed with various parks, open spaces and gardens which contribute the city's government initiatives in protecting and preserving its urbanscape for city dwellers for them to benefit from. The Iloilo River Esplanade which stretches on both sides of Iloilo River which has been designed a renowned Filipino Architect Paulo Alcazaren who designed Clarke Quay in Singapore, is the longest linear park and riverside boulevard in the Philippines. The Iloilo River Esplanade along its stretch is dense with mangrove trees where 22 of the 35 species of mangroves that is endemic to the Philippines can be found. The mangroves along the Iloilo River Esplanade is also a breeding ground for marine species.

Iloilo city before is re-incorporation is a conglomerate of former separate towns during the Spanish up to the American colonial eras thus they have their own civic centers or Plazas equipped with ornamental gardens and endemic ornamental and non-ornamental or fruit trees. Plazas have long been played the role for the city dwellers to socialize and recreate.

There are also numerous recent development initiatives that the city government is pushing through for its continued efforts for more parks and open spaces in the city such as the redevelopment of Iloilo City Civic Center which includes the Iloilo City Hall with the revitalization of the former 'Plaza de Aduana' or Sunburst Park and the relocation and building of the new Freedom Grandstand at the Muelle Loney (Loney Wharf) with pocket size and mini gardens. The said same initiative is also being laid-out and undertaken with the Provincial capitol complex of the Iloilo Provincial Government with initial phase of the Iloilo Provincial Jail being renovated and restored becoming the National Museum of the Philippines – Western Visayas regional Museum and the landscaping of the provincial capitol complex.

Smart City Initiative

Iloilo City is closer to being a smart city as it is providing free internet access in public areas, aiming to decrease its carbon emission, higher efficiency and productivity to underscore Iloilo as a livable city. Electric vehicles are operating in the city. Pumping Stations were installed to prevent flooding. Air quality is being monitored and graded as clean per international standards. Taxis are advised to use an automotive navigation system to inform passengers of their location and for navigation through streets and alleys. Oher services include, phone calls for emergency rescue, device charging stations, local wayfinding, free housing in Sooc, Lanit and San Isidro and more. All barangays of Iloilo City have installed Closed-circuit television to predict traffic police requirements and for public safety.

The city has banned the use of plastic straws in the city, strict compliance of establishments along the stretch of Iloilo river to install waste water treatment facilities, and segregation of bio-degradable and degradable rubbish. Restaurants and fast-food stores use oxo-degradable plastic bags and recycled paper-boxes. Iloilo city sustained its tree-planting programs through forestation of endemic and ornamental trees along the city's major thoroughfares and mangroves along the city's creeks, estuaries, waterfront areas and rivers and clean-up drive.

The city was awarded in 2017 with Clean Air City Award by the Clean Air Philippine Movement. The award is recognition of Iloilo urban planning in diligence for maintaining the good air quality

For the second time, Iloilo City has been conferred the Galing Pook Award for its entry the Iloilo Batiano River Development Project. The award recognizes best local government practices worthy of replication by other local government units (LGUs).

Healthcare 

Iloilo City is the leading  healthcare center of the Western Visayas region and is rapidly becoming one of the medical tourism hubs in the Philippines. The Iloilo City Health Office and the Department of Health (Philippines) is responsible for the implementation and planning of the health care programs provided by the city government. The three government-run hospitals in the city are the West Visayas State University Medical Center (WVSUMC), Western Visayas Medical Center (WVMC), and the Iloilo City Hospital. The Iloilo City Health Office operates and supervises Health Centers in barrios or barangays in the city.

The city provides free immunization programs for children, specifically targeted against the seven major diseases – smallpox, diphtheria, tetanus, yellow fever, whooping cough, polio, and measles.

Iloilo's healthcare is also largely provided by private and church-affiliated corporations. Private hospitals that operates in the city are the following:

 CPU–Iloilo Mission Hospital (CPU IMH)
 St. Paul's Hospital Iloilo (SPH Iloilo)
 The Medical City-Iloilo (TMC Iloilo)
 Metro Iloilo Hospital and Medical Center (MIHMC)
 Medicus Medical Center (MMC)
 Qualimed Hospital Iloilo (QHI)
 Iloilo Doctors' Hospital (IDH)
 Medicus Cancer Institute (MCI)
 Asia Pacific Medical Center – Iloilo (APMC Iloilo)
 Seamen's AMEOSUP Hospital

There are also notable maternity clinics and centers in the city which include the La Paz Maternity and Reproductive Health Center (LMRHC) and CPU Birthing Center of the Central Philippine University.

The oldest running hospital in Iloilo City is the CPU–Iloilo Mission Hospital. It was founded as Union Mission Hospital in 1901 by the Presbyterian American missionary Joseph Andrew Hall as "the first Protestant and American hospital in the Philippines". Iloilo Mission Hospital serves as the university hospital of Central Philippine University. The hospital pioneered nursing education in the Philippines when it established the Union Mission Hospital Training School for Nurses in 1906, the present-day Central Philippine University - College of Nursing, the first school of Nursing in the country. The nursing school produced the first three nursing graduates, the first rank number one topnotcher and the first number one top-performing school in the history of nursing licensure and education in the Philippines.

Saint Paul's Hospital Iloilo which was founded in 1911 by the French catholic missionaries through the help of the American Catholics, is the oldest running hospital founded by Daughters of Saint Paul of Chartres in the Philippines. At present, it serves as an affiliated hospital of the St. Paul University Iloilo. Both St. Paul's Hospital Iloilo and CPU–Iloilo Mission Hospital are considered notable heritage healthcare institutions in Iloilo.

The two hospitals in the city, the Qualimed Hospital – Iloilo and The Medical City – Iloilo are newly built ones of the two of the renowned hospital groups based in Manila in the country. The Qualimed Hospital – Iloilo of the Ayala Corporation and Mercado General Hospital, Inc. is the first Ayala-Qualimed hospital outside Luzon, while The Medical City – Iloilo is likewise the first The Medical City hospital in Visayas and Mindanao of the group of healthcare institution giant, The Medical City Group. Both hospitals are equipped with state-of-the-art medical facilities catering to the community in general.

There are three public hospitals in the city operated and managed by the government:

 West Visayas State University Medical Center (WVSUMC)
 Western Visayas Medical Center (WVMC)
 Iloilo City Hospital (ICH) [under construction]

The West Visayas State University Medical Center (WVSU Medical Center), commonly referred to as Don Benito, is a government-run hospital administered under the West Visayas State University. It primarily serves the indigent populace in the city and region, has auxiliary centers established by the national government for the Western Visayas region through the Department of Health of the Philippines – the WVSU/DOH Regional Cancer Center and the soon to be built 10 storey facility WVSU/DOH Regional Lung and Heart Center.

The Western Visayas Medical Center is the largest referral public hospital in the Western Visayas region. It is operated by the Department of Health. The hospital facilities include a 6 storey heart & lung specialty building, 3 storey dialysis building, a 2 storey main building which houses the administrative and emergency and other auxiliary health units of the hospital, and the WVMC annex building (5-6 storey).

The Iloilo City Hospital which is undergoing construction in San Pedro, Molo, is the city government's project to cope with the healthcare demand of the metropolis's indigent citizens. Components of the hospital include a 5 storey main hall, a medical arts building, and USWAG Iloilo City Molecular Laboratory.

Transportation

Public transport 

Iloilo City is served mostly by passenger jeepneys, white metered taxis and tricycles within the city limits. The passad jeepneys of Iloilo are known for their sleek and sedan-like design. These often serve fixed routes and mostly travel on the city's major and secondary roads. Jeepneys are also the main mode of transportation to Metropolitan Iloilo areas. Tricycles serve most secondary roads and city communities.  Large passad jeepneys and buses link Iloilo City to the rest of the province and the island of Panay. Buses bound for Metro Manila, Mindoro, Batangas, Cebu, Negros and Mindanao are also available via the Roll-on, Roll-off ferry services of the Strong Republic Nautical Highway. Mini-shuttle vans also serve major points in Panay Island.

Iloilo is one of the few cities in the Philippines that recently initiated to adopt the mini-bus like type modern PUJ or modern Jeepneys in contrast to the President Rodrigo Duterte's administration to phase out the old dilapidated jeepneys as the mode of mass public transportation in the Philippines.

In March 2019, the Land Transportation Franchising and Regulatory Board announced the opening of a new Premium Point-to-Point Bus Service in Iloilo City with express bus services to the airports in Cabatuan, Kalibo and Boracay (Caticlan).

Integrated transport terminals 

Iloilo City has five Major Integrated Transport Terminals located at the city's perimeter areas: the Iloilo North ITS (Integrated Transport System) Terminal/Iloilo North Ceres Bus Terminal (NCBT) located at Tagbak, Jaro District is the transport hub serving passengers to/from north western municipalities of Iloilo, City of Passi and northwestern Panay (Capiz and Aklan including Boracay Island); Iloilo Central Line ITS (Integrated Transport System) Terminal/Pavia Peoples Terminal (PPT) in Ungka, Jaro District is the transport terminal for passengers to/from central municipalities of Iloilo; Aleonsan ITS (Integrated Transport System) Terminal at Hibao – and in Mandurriao for those to/from the upland municipalities of San Miguel, Alimodian and Leon (including Bucari, Leon); Iloilo South ITS (Integrated Transport System) Terminal/Iloilo South Ceres Bus Terminal (SCBT) located at Mohon in Villa de Arevalo for going to/from the southern municipalities of Iloilo and to/from the province of Antique; and Iloilo North Coast ITS (Integrated Transport System) Terminal at Ticud, Lapaz District for those going to/from the northern coastal municipalities of Iloilo (including Sicogon Island and Isla de Gigante all part of Carles, Iloilo).

Cycling

The city has been hailed and earned its reputation as the Bicycling capital of the Philippines, a yielded effort through the recent modern economic renaissance of Iloilo City by the local and the national government units and different stakeholders by educating the city locals on the importance of a bike-able city and building dedicated bicycle lanes on city main thoroughfares. The metropolis has a network of nearly 100 kilometers of bicycle lanes and the longest of which is located along the stretch of Diversion Road. The annual Iloilo Bike Festival has drawn bicycling enthusiasts throughout the country. By 2019, Dutch Government helped out iloilo City to become a bike-friendly city.

Railway 

From 1907 to the 1980s, Panay Railways operated a railroad from Roxas City to the port area of Muelle Loney along the Iloilo River in Iloilo City. In 2022, Panay Railways announced its opening to foreign ownership to reconstruct its former train lines, which will reconnect the major cities in Panay, including Caticlan in Malay, Aklan.

Airport 

Iloilo International Airport is the 4th busiest in the Philippines  with international flight to Singapore and Hong Kong and vice versa serving passengers from Western Visayas Region, Palawan and Mindanao. For domestic flights to/from Metro Manila, Caticlan, Cebu, Cuyo, Puerto Princesa, Sipalay, General Santos, Cagayan de Oro and Davao City, Iloilo International Airport is the airport serving the general area of Metropolitan Iloilo–Guimaras, the province of Antique and the rest of Iloilo Province. It opened to commercial traffic on June 14, 2007, replacing the Old Iloilo Airport at the Mandurriao District. The new airport inherited its IATA and ICAO airport codes. It is linked to the city through Sen. Benigno S. Aquino Jr. Avenue and served by metered taxis, airport shuttle vans and multicabs.

Recently, the national government has approved the ₱791 million budget for the expansion of the Iloilo International Airport.

Seaport 

The Port of Iloilo is the port serving the general area of Iloilo and the premier port in the Western Visayas Region. The new Port of Iloilo is located on a site away from the older port facilities. It is situated in the southern coast of Panay Island, in Panay Gulf. With Guimaras Island guarding the port from violent storms, it has one of the safest and most natural harbors in the Philippines

The Iloilo International Port Complex (IIPC) is located on 20.8 hectares of reclaimed land. It has modern facilities that include 11,400 sq. meters of open space for unhampered operations, supplemented by a backup area of 97,000 sq. meters, a crane, rails of 348 lineal meters; roll-on-roll-off support; a 7,800 container freight stations; and a 720 sq. meter passenger shed. The port complex is ideal for ships plying international routes having a berth length of 400 meters, a width of 26.26 meters and a berthing depth of 10.50 meters. It is currently expanding with the reclamation of the west side sea front portion of the complex

The Iloilo Domestic Port Complex (IDPC), located near Fort San Pedro and formerly the Old Foreign Pier, serves inter-island passenger and cargo ferries which serves the routes Manila, Palawan, Cebu, Zamboanga and Cagayan de Oro. It is located near the mouth of Iloilo River at the vicinity of the Western Visayas Regional Government Center at the City Proper District. It is also the port of call for several domestic shipping companies such as SuperFerry or 2GO Travel, Negros Navigation, Sulpicio Lines, Cokaliong Shipping, Trans-Asia Shipping Lines and others. The colloquial name "Fort San Pedro" refers to the old Spanish fortress beside it that was destroyed during World War II and soon to be restored by the Department of Tourism (DOT) under TIEZA.

Muelle Loney or Iloilo River Wharf is the original port of the city. Opened to international trade in 1855, it has served as the trans-shipment docks for muscovado sugar in the late 19th to the first half of the 20th century. It has undergone several times of expansion and improvement. Today, it serves smaller cargo ships, roll-on roll-off ferries bound for Guimaras and Negros Island and fast ferries that ply Iloilo-Bacolod route regularly. In September 2014, the newly opened Iloilo River Port Complex (IRPC) at Lapuz District started its operation to replace the Iloilo River Wharf.

Iloilo-Guimaras Jetty Ports for Guimaras outrigger ferries are located at Calle Ortiz and Parola. The terminal at Calle Ortiz serves Jordan, Guimaras-bound passenger and cargo outrigger boats, while Parola terminal serve Buenavista, Guimaras-bound ferries. Soon the Iloilo Jetty Port Complex (IJPC) at the Western Visayas Regional Government Center will replace the two jetty ports, the complex is complete with a modern passenger terminal building, a pumpboat fuel refilling station, a  children's park with a marine museum and a CityMall complex by Double Drangon Properties. This project of the City Government was achieved through public-private partnership.

Roll-on/roll-off ferry service, known in as RO-RO, is available from to Iloilo City. There is also a ro-ro service to Cebu via Negros. It is ranked third in terms of ship calls at 11,853, fourth in cargo throughout at 491,719 million metric tons and fourth in passenger traffic at 2.4 million annually.

The Iloilo Fish Port Complex (IFPC) is the only and the major center of fish trading and marine products processing in all of Visayas. The port complex is the traditional landing site of bagnetters and other fishing bancas in Iloilo City and nearby towns. This strategic location has made the port the major fish/marine source of major supermarkets, hotels and restaurants and local public markets in the country and abroad.

Its services includes, unloading and marketing facilities for fish and other fishery/aquatic products both for local and foreign markets; services and facilities for harbor operations such drydocking/repair shop, fuel, oil, water and ice conveyance and for transshipping products; processing, refrigeration and other post-harvest services including product pre-processing, freezing through contact freezer, cold storages and top-grade facilities for the processing of marine products such as prawn, abalone, cuttlefish, lobster, nylon shell, octopus, slippertail, squid, whiting and bangus; and raw land for the establishment of fishery-related factories.

The complex is situated in a 21-hectare reclamation at southern part of the City Proper District. In March 2022, the fish port complex was granted ₱570 million for the expansion of its facilities which will include the construction of a new fish processing plant, establishment of a fish canning facility and the construction of an alternative energy source.

Utilities 

A 72 MW Diesel Fuel Power Plant operated by Panay Power Corporation and a 164 MW coal power plant operated by Panay Energy Development Corporation (PEDC) provides power generation for Iloilo City, both situated in Barangay Ingore in Lapaz district. PEDC plans for a third coal-fired power generation facility. The newest generator will be on top of the existing 164-MWs for an additional 150-megawatt to be generated that will help produce a total of 404 MW supply for the Panay and Guimaras islands.

Power distribution had been facilitated by Panay Electric Company (PECO) since 1923 as one of the oldest private electricity distributor companies in the Philippines, but MORE Electric and Power Corporation (MORE Power) of the Spanish Filipino Billionaire Enrique K. Razon, has taken over PECO's operations and acts as the sole power distributor in Iloilo City.

Metro Pacific Iloilo Water (MPIW), the metropolis' sole water distributor, has established a joint venture with Metro Pacific Water (MPW) and Metro Iloilo Water District (MIWD), to bolster the former's service of supplying potable water to the city and the whole Metro Iloilo.

Education 

Being the center of education in Western Visayas Region, the city and the province of Iloilo has a total of ten major universities.

Iloilo City alone hosts to 8 universities such as the Central Philippine University (CPU), University of the Philippines Visayas (UPV), which houses the University of the Philippines High School in Iloilo (UPHSI), University of San Agustin (USAI), West Visayas State University (WVSU), Iloilo Science and Technology University (formerly WVCST) (ISAT-U), University of Iloilo (UI), St. Paul University Iloilo (SPUI), and John B. Lacson Foundation Maritime University (JBLFMU).

Three of the universities which are private in the city are founded by Christian religious orders and sects. Roman Catholics established the University of San Agustin (Spanish), St. Paul University Iloilo  (American through their French confreres) and the Protestants who founded the Central Philippine University (American Baptist).

 Central Philippine University – The first and only Western Visayan university in the list of the top universities in Asia and the world for 2021 to 2023 by Quacquarelli Symonds, one of the two biggest world university ranking agencies after Times Higher Education, is the largest university in the metropolis with a population of nearly 15,000+ enrollees on its 24-hectare main campus in Jaro, Iloilo City. Formally founded in 1905 (but dates back its establishment in 1901 when CPU–Iloilo Mission Hospital, its university hospital, was opened by Presbyterian Protestant Americans) under the auspices of the American Baptist Foreign Mission Society through a grant given by the American industrialist and philanthropist, John D. Rockefeller, when the Americans brought their Protestant faith prior and after the Spanish–American War and the Treaty of Paris (1898) which ceded the bureaucracy of Philippines from Spain to the United States. The university is the first Baptist and Second American university in the Philippines and Asia (after Silliman University (1901) in Dumaguete). The university ranks number one in Western Visayas region with 2 Commission on Higher Education (Philippines) Centers of Excellence designated programs in Agriculture and Business Administration and 4 Commission on Higher Education (Philippines) Centers of Development designated programs in Chemical Engineering, Electrical Engineering, Electronics Engineering, & Teacher Education.

Central Philippine University holds many firsts in the Philippines in some of the units that it established – the CPU Philippine Center for Packaging Engineering and Technology (CPU PC-PET) (first of its kind in South East Asia); Central Philippine University College of Agriculture, Resources and Environmental Sciences (first government recognized agricultural school outside Luzon); Central Philippine University Republic (CPU Republic) (first and oldest organized student government in South East Asia); CPU TV Channel (first university-based TV Channel in Asia); Central Philippine University College of Theology (first Baptist theological seminary in the Philippines); and Iloilo Mission Hospital (the university hospital of the university) (first American and Protestant hospital in the Philippines).

The university enrolls and is widely known to foreign students who wants to study in Panay and Western Visayas with 216 foreign students studying from 27 foreign countries. The university is associated and has produced people who became notable in their respective fields – Rodolfo Ganzon (Senator and first popularly elected Mayor of Iloilo City), Jovito Salonga (Senator), Perfecto R. Yasay, Jr. (Secretary of Foreign Affairs of the Philippines), National Artists Ramon Muzones (for Literature) and Leonor Orosa-Goquingco (for Dance), Leonor Briones (Secretary of Education of the Philippines under President Duterte's administration), Gilopez Kabayao (Musician and Ramon Magsaysay Award laureate (Asian Nobel Prize), and Jose Vasquez Aguilar (The first Filipino recipient of the Ramon Magsaysay Award and also first recipient of the award for Government Service category for his work as the "Father of the Community School Movement"), among others.

 University of San Agustin – founded in 1904 by the oldest Roman Catholic religious who came to the Philippines – The Order of St. Augustin, is the First Augustinian University in Asia and the Pacific. It received its university status in March 1953 which also holds the distinction as the First university in Western Visayas.
 St. Paul University Iloilo – Founded in the 1940s as a subject to the propagation of Catholicism in the American regime in the Philippines supported the spread of Protestant religion with the help of the American Catholics by their French confreres under the order of St. Paul or Chartres. St. Paul Hospital of Iloilo, the university hospital of the university which was founded in 1911 predates the university's founding.

The city universities of University of the Philippines Visayas – Iloilo City College Campus, West Visayas State University and Iloilo Science and Technology University are all controlled and subsidized by the government or as state universities.

 University of the Philippines Visayas – is one of the autonomous units of the University of the Philippines System with its main campus in Miag-ao, Iloilo. The Iloilo City satellite campus is focused in Business, Accountancy and social sciences academic courses. The main hall of in the university's main campus used to be the old Iloilo City Hall and houses now the UPV Art Gallery. UPV has been designated by the Commission on Higher Education (Philippines) as Center of Excellence in Chemistry.

The university's alumni have excelled and became notable in their fields which include – Franklin Drilon; Miriam Defensor Santiago, Senator and first Asian to be nominated for a seat in the International Criminal Court; Myrtle Sarrosa, celebrity and TV host; and Jed Patrick Mabilog, 2014 World Mayor Award – Top 5 best Mayor.

 West Visayas State University – formally established under the tutelage of the Thomasites in 1924 but dates back its founding in 1902 through the Philippine Normal School system during the American regime. The campus in Iloilo City is the main campus that encompasses the university system. West excels in Nursing, Medicine and Teacher Education annual licensure examinations through the topnotchers that it produces and being on the list of top performing school. The main campus has been declared as Commission on Higher Education (Philippines) Center of Excellence in Teacher Education and Center of Development in Nursing.
 Iloilo Science and Technology University – founded in 1905 as Iloilo School of Arts and Trade by the Americans to continue the School of Arts and Trade that was built during the Spanish colonial era that was closed is focused in technological and technical courses. Its Education academic program has been designated by the Commission on Higher Education (Philippines) as Center of Development in Teacher Education.

Other private universities in the city include:

 University of Iloilo – founded as a legacy institution of Lopez family of Iloilo, it was purchased and is now under the management of PHINMA Group under its arm PHINMA Education Network.
 John B. Lacson Foundation Maritime University – the first maritime university in the Philippines founded by Juan Bautista Lacson, offers academic maritime courses.

The Ateneo Graduate School of Business under the Ateneo de Manila University has a satellite campus in Iloilo City housed at the Ateneo de Iloilo Main Campus. The Ateneo Graduate School of Business – Iloilo offers Master of Business Administration (MBA) – Regis program. It is an initial part of the Ateneo educational system's plan in offering collegiate courses to make Ateneo de Iloilo a full university in the future.

Other universities that maintain units offering off-campus extension programs in Iloilo City include the Philippine Christian University (through a partnership with St. Roberts International College) and Guimaras State University.

The Iloilo City Community College (ICCC), a city project for the city to have its own community-city public college, is administered by the Iloilo City Government through the Commission on Higher Education. It offers undergraduate degrees in business, information technology and travel management.

Iloilo is also home to numerous private colleges and schools such as the Iloilo Doctors College (IDC), one PAREF-affiliated high school, the Westbridge School for Boys, St. Therese – MTC Colleges (ST-MTCC), Western Institute of Technology (WIT), De Paul College (DPC) (defunct), ABE International College of Business and Economics, ACLC College of Iloilo, Computer College of the Visayas, Dominican College of Iloilo, Great Saviour College, AMA Computer College – Iloilo Campus, STI College – Iloilo, Interface Computer College – Iloilo, IMAPF – School of Midwifery, Philippine College of Aeronautics, Science and Technology, ACSI College – Iloilo, ABBA Institute of Technology, Iloilo Scholastic Academy, Hua Siong College of Iloilo, Sun Yat Sen High School, Cabalum Western College, St. Anne College of Iloilo, St. Augustine School of Nursing – Iloilo, Assumption Iloilo (run by the Congregation of the Religious of the Assumption).

Others include Ateneo de Iloilo – Santa Maria Catholic School (run by the Society of Jesus), Angelicum School Iloilo (run by the Order of Preachers), Philippine Science High School-Western Visayas, Colegio de las Hijas de Jesus (or simply Hijas de Jesus which is run by the Congregation of the Daughters of Jesus), San Jose Catholic School (which is run by the Order of St. Agustin), Colegio de San Jose (CSJ) and Colegio del Sagrado Corazon de Jesus (CSCJ) which are both run by the Congregation of the Daughters of Charity of Saint Vincent de Paul, and Asian College of Aeronautics. Colegio de San Jose is the oldest school for girls in Western Visayas which is now 141 years old. Iloilo is also home to numerous religious formation houses, St. Joseph Regional Seminary for Theologate studies, the 148-year-old St. Vincent Ferrer Seminary for Collegiate studies and Mill Hill Formation House of the Mill Hill Missionaries. In June 2012, the city government opened the Iloilo City Community College at Molo, Iloilo City.

The Department of Education – Division of Iloilo City covers 88 private schools and 52 public schools.

Notable people

Sister cities
Local

 Bacolod, Negros Occidental, 2010
 Cebu City, Cebu
 Davao City, Davao del Sur
 General Santos, South Cotabato, 1980
 Koronadal, South Cotabato, 2014
 Makati, Metro Manila
 Mandaue, Cebu, 2007
 Parañaque, Metro Manila
 Quezon City, Metro Manila, 1994
 Rosario, Batangas, 2011
 San Juan, Metro Manila, 2013
 Tacurong, Sultan Kudarat, 2014
 Taguig, Metro Manila

International
 Bilbao, Spain
 Dededo, Guam, 1994
 Kulim, Malaysia, 2013
 Phnom Penh, Cambodia
 Qingdao, Shandong, China, 2003
 Stockton, California, United States, 1956
 Yulin, Guangxi, China, 2011

See also 

 Calle Real
 Roman Catholic Archdiocese of Jaro
Iloilo City Proper
 Metro Iloilo–Guimaras

Notes

References

External links 

 
 Iloilo Travel Website 
 [ Philippine Standard Geographic Code]

 
Cities in Iloilo
Highly urbanized cities in the Philippines
Former national capitals
Populated places established in 1581
1581 establishments in the Philippines
Provincial capitals of the Philippines
Populated coastal places in the Philippines
Port cities and towns in the Philippines